This is a list of foreign players that play or have played in the top league in football clubs from the territory of Serbia.

In this list are included the foreign players that:
 Play or have played in the Serbian SuperLiga (from 2006 until nowadays), and in the clubs from the territory of Serbia in the First League of Serbia and Montenegro (including FR Yugoslavia, from 1992 until 2006) and in the Yugoslav First League (from 1923 until 1992).
 Have been part of the club roster in the league.
 Have not been capped for the Serbian national team or the Yugoslav national team, except the ones that have been capped for other national teams, as well.
 Have been born in Serbia and capped by a foreign national team. This includes players that have dual citizenship.
 In this list are only indicated the top-level clubs. If a player has also played in some lower-level club in Serbia, those clubs are excluded, just as all the foreign players that have only played in lower leagues in Serbia.

Notes:
 The players that played in clubs from Kosovo are only included if they played in a top league club within the Yugoslav or Serbian football league system.
 The players from the countries that once made part of Yugoslavia (Bosnia-Herzegovina, Croatia, Macedonia, Montenegro and Slovenia) have inclusion criteria indicated in each section.
 The years correspond to seasons, not calendar years, and represent the seasons that the player represented the club, not necessarily being all in the top league, but at least one. If only one year is indicated in parentheses, it means that the player has played only that half of season.
 Players in bold are players that have at least one cap for their national team.
 Teams in bold are the current team of that player.

Abkhazia 
 Shabat Logua – Bačka Bačka Palanka (2019–2020), Zlatibor Čajetina (2020–2021)
 Daur Kvekveskiri – Napredak Kruševac (2016–2017)

Albania 
 Mehmet Dragusha – Priština (1997–1998)
 Besnik Hasi – Priština (1991–1992, 1993–1994)

 Albert Stroni – Partizan (1992–1993)
 Faton Xhemaili – Radnik Surdulica (2018–2019)

Algeria 
 Adda Djeziri – Vojvodina (2017–2018)

Angola 
 Alexander Christovão – Javor Ivanjica (2016–2017)

Antigua and Barbuda 
 Josh Parker – Red Star (2014–2016)

Argentina 

 Hernán Barcos – Red Star (2007–2008)
 Guido Barreyro – Inđija (2010–2011)
 Mauro Carabajal – Vojvodina (1998–1999)
 Mateo García – Red Star (2019–2020)
 Luis Ibáñez – Red Star (2015–2016)
 Cristian Jeandet – Sartid Smederevo (1998–1999)
 Hernán Marcos – Vojvodina (1998–1999)
 Pablo Mouche – Red Star (2016–2017)
 Pablo Ostrowski – Vojvodina (2007–2009)
 Matías Porcari – Radnički Kragujevac (2013–2014)
 Diego Suárez – OFK Beograd (2006–2007)
 Alex Vigo - Red Star (2022–present)
 Tomás Villoldo – OFK Beograd (2015–2016)

Armenia 
 Hovhannes Grigoryan – Banat Zrenjanin (2006–2007)
 Artur Yedigaryan – Proleter Novi Sad (2019–2020)

Australia 

 David Aceski – OFK Beograd (2001–2002)
 Tomislav Arčaba – BSK Borča (2010–2012), OFK Beograd (2015–2017)
 Eli Babalj – Red Star (2012–2013)
 Branko Buljevic – OFK Beograd (1966–1968)
 Matthew Byrne – Donji Srem (2011–2013)
 Michael Curcija – Partizan (2000–2001)
 Milos Degenek – Red Star (2018–2022)
 Bobby Dragas – Red Star (2000–2001)
 Milan Ivanović – Red Star (1978–1982, 1985–1986, 1988–1989), OFK Beograd (1982–1985), Radnički Niš (1986–1988)
 Aleksandar Jovanović – Vojvodina (2007–2008), Hajduk Kula (2011–2012)
 Andrew Marveggio – Mačva Šabac (2018–2019)
 Dejan Pandurević – Zemun (2017–2018)
 Milan Susak – Vojvodina (2002–2007)
 Doug Utjesenovic – OFK Beograd (1967–1969)
 Goran Zarić – Borac Čačak (1995–1996), Vojvodina (1996–1999), Čukarički Stankom (2002–2004)

Austria 

 Aleksandar Dragović – Red Star (2021–present)
 Grabliker – Budućnost Valjevo (193_–1940)
 Otto Hofmann – Radnički Beograd (1921–192x)
 Goran Kartalija – Vojvodina (1988–1991)
 Aleksandar Kostić – Radnički Niš (2018–2019)
 Robert Lang – Jugoslavija (1920–1921)
 Saša Lazić  – Rad Beograd (2017–2018)
 Franz Machek – RFK Bor (1941–1943)
 Theodor Mantler – UTK Novi Sad (1918–192_)
 Armin Mašović – Novi Pazar (2014–2015)
 Kenan Muslimović – Novi Pazar (2016–2017)
 Dejan Nešović – Radnik Surdulica (2016–2017)
 Alexander Neufeld (Sándor Nemes) – BSK Beograd (1932–1933)
 Dejan Obućina – Smederevo (2012–2013)
 Roman Pany – Jedinstvo Beograd (1938–1939)
 Aleksandar Popović – Vojvodina (2005–2009)
 Alexander Schönbacher – BSK Beograd (191x–1914)
 Srđan Spiridonović – Red Star (2020–2022)
 Daniel Sudar – Zlatibor Čajetina (2020–2021)
 Petar Zivkov – OFK Beograd (2013–2014)

Azerbaijan 
 Murad Hüseynov – Sloboda Užice (2013–2014)
 Branimir Subašić – Železnik (1998–2002), Red Star (2008–2010), OFK Beograd (2015–2017)

Belarus 
 Samuilo Suzina – BSK Belgrade (1924–1925)
 Ilya Lukashevich – Proleter Novi Sad (2019–2020)

Bosnia and Herzegovina 

Excluded the players that played before 1992 when Bosnia and Herzegovina became independent and counted as domestic.
 Edin Ademović – Sloboda Užice (2009–2011), Novi Pazar (2011–2012), BSK Borča (2012–2013)
 Admir Aganović – Partizan (2003–2004), Zemun (2006–2007), Mladost Lučani (2006–2008), Čukarički Stankom (2007–2009)
 Almir Aganspahić – Novi Pazar (2020–2021), Čukarički (2021-2022, 2022-present)
 Esmir Ahmetović – Jagodina (2011–2012)
 Zoran Amidžić – Hajduk Kula (1996–1998), Proleter Zrenjanin (1999–2000)
 Mile Andrić – Sloboda Užice (1991–1994, 2001–2002)
 Luka Asentić – Bačka Bačka Palanka (2018–2019)
 Miloš Babić – Obilić (2000–2004)
 Delimir Bajić – Sloboda Užice (2012–2013), Rad Beograd (2014–2015)
 Miloš Bajić – OFK Beograd (2011)–2012), Napredak Kruševac (2011–2015), Mladost Lučani (2015–2016), Bačka Bačka Palanka (2017–2018)
 Branimir Bajić – Partizan (2000–2007)
 Haris Bešlija – Borac Čačak (2010–2011)´
 Edin Biber – Radnik Surdulica (2020–2022)
 Milorad Bilbija – OFK Kikinda (1993–1994)
 Nemanja Bilbija – Vojvodina (2009–2013)
 Sergej Bjelica - Voždovac (2022-present)
 Nikola Bjeloš – Zlatibor Čajetina (2020–2021)
 Ognjen Blagojević – BSK Borča (2011–2012)
 Slaviša Bogdanović – Rad Beograd (2011–2012), Spartak Subotica (2012–2013)
 Jadranko Bogičević – Red Star (2003–2005)
 Andrej Bosnić – Čukarički (2020–2021)
 Filip Božić – Mačva Šabac (2017–2021)
 Igor Božić – Rad Beograd (2005–2009)
 Mario Božić – Milicionar Beograd (2003–2004), Voždovac (2013–2014), Borac Čačak (2014–2015)
 Aleksandar Bratić – Hajduk Kula (1992–1993), Rad Beograd (1993–1996), Red Star (1996–1997), OFK Beograd (1997–1999, 2006–2007)
 Aleksandar Brđanin – OFK Beograd (2001–2002)
 Esad Brkić – Spartak Subotica (1997–1999)
 Dženan Bureković – Vojvodina (2016–2018), Spartak Subotica (2022-present)
 Davor Cavrić – Banat Zrenjanin (2007–2012, 2013–2014), Hajduk Kula (2012–2013)
 Borisav Cicović – OFK Beograd (2011–2012)
 Zoran Čampara – Rad Beograd (1992–1995)
 Novica Čomić – Mladost Apatin (2001–2005)
 Muhidin Čoralić – Zemun (1990–1993)
 Miroslav Čovilo – Inđija (2010–2011), Spartak Subotica (2010–2011), Hajduk Kula (2011–2012)
 Marko Čubrilo – Radnik Surdulica (2017–2019)
 Nebojša Ćorović – Spartak Subotica (1997–1999)
 Đorđe Ćosić - Mladost GAT (2022-present)
 Mehmed Ćosić - Kolubara Lazarevac (2022-present)
 Semir Dacić – Novi Pazar (2020–2021)
 Nikola Damjanac – Partizan (1991–1993, 1994–1997, 1998–2000), OFK Beograd (1993–1994, 2001–2002, 2003–2005)
 Dario Damjanović – Novi Pazar (2012)–2013), Jagodina (2012–2014), OFK Beograd (2015–2016)
 Goran Dasović – Vojvodina (1995–1996)
 Darko Dejanović – Rad Beograd (2014–2018)
 Nikša Dimitrijević – Zvezdara (2001–2002)
 Srđan Dobrić – BSK Borča (2010–2011)
Đurađ Dobrijević – Kolubara Lazarevac (2019–2020,2021–2022)
 Dalibor Dragić – Vojvodina (1999–2000), Mladost Apatin (2006–(2007)
 Goran Dragović – Radnički Beograd (2001–2002), Voždovac (2002–2008, 2013–2014), Javor Ivanjica (2008–2011)
 Nemanja Dragutinović – Novi Pazar (2020–2021), Radnički Kragujevac (2021–2022)
 Nenad Drljača – Vojvodina (1991–1993)
 Feđa Dudić – Novi Pazar (2011–2012)
 Filip Dujmović – Spartak Subotica (2019–2021), Radnički Niš (2021-2022)
 Amer Dupovac – Borac Čačak (2017–2018)
 Darko Đajić – Vojvodina (2009–2010)
 Ognjen Đelmić – Rad Beograd (2006–2009), Vojvodina (2017–2018)
 Boban Đerić – Javor Ivanjica (2017–2020)
 Uroš Đerić – Radnički Niš (2013)–2014), Borac Čačak (2013–2015), Mladost Lučani (2015–2016), Napredak Kruševac (2017–2018)
 Željko Đokić – Javor Ivanjica (2007–2009, 2009–2011), Novi Pazar (2014–2015)
 Goran Đukić – Hajduk Kula (1993–1998), Milicionar Beograd (1998–2001), Red Star (2001–2002)
 Aleksandar Đurašović – Spartak Subotica (1999–2000)
 Saša Đuričić – Hajduk Kula (2000–2001)
 Siniša Đurić – Zemun (1996–2001)
 Predrag Erak – Zemun (2002–(2003)
 Nikola Eskić – Napredak Kruševac (2016–2020), Bačka Bačka Palanka (2020–2021)
 Marko Filipović – OFK Beograd (1998–1999, 2000–2002), Hajduk Beograd (1999–2000, 2004–2005)
 Vladimir Gaćinović – Bečej (1991–1997)
 Radovan Gajić – Proleter Zrenjanin (199_–199_), Obilić (1997–1998)
 Aleksandar Galić – Vojvodina (2002–2003)
 Mladen Galić – Bačka Bačka Palanka (2015–2017), TSC Bačka Topola (2017–2020), Proleter Novi Sad (2020–2021)
 Miloš Galin – Rad Beograd (2008–2009)
 Sahmir Garčević – Obilić (1997–1998)
 Dragan Glogovac – Rad Beograd (1992–1995), Sartid Smederevo (1999–2002)
 Stevo Glogovac – Zvezdara (1995–1997), Rad Beograd (1997–1999), Red Star (1999–2002), Zemun (2003–2006), FK Bežanija (2006–2007)
 Ognjen Gnjatić – Rad Beograd (2012–2015)
 Miljan Govedarica – Donji Srem (2013–2014)
 Branko Grahovac – Borac Čačak (2007–2010)
 Daniel Graovac – Vojvodina (2018–2019)
 Vladan Grujić – Obilić (1999–2000), Red Star (2001–2002), Voźdovac (2015–2016)
 Nebojša Gudelj – Partizan (1991–1994)
 Elmin Hadžikadunić – Radnički Niš (2016–2017)
 Ismar Hairlahović – Zlatibor Čajetina (2020–2021)
 Faris Handžić – Novi Pazar (2021–2022)
 Mersad Hankić – Čukarički Stankom (2004–(2005)
 Nermin Haskić – Radnički Niš (2018–2020)
 Dušan Hodžić - Radnik Surdulica (2021–present)
 Ante Hrkać – Mladost Lučani (2021–2022)
 Faruk Hujdurović – OFK Beograd (1993–1994), Hajduk Kula (1995–1996)
 Jovan Ilić – Proleter Novi Sad (2019–2022)
 Đorđe Inđić – Zemun (1996–2001)
 Bojan Jamina – OFK Beograd (2000–2001)
 Nemanja Janičić – Napredak Kruševac (2011–2015), Borac Čačak (2016–2017)
 Petar Jelić – OFK Beograd (2007–2010), Novi Pazar (2013–2014), Rad Beograd (2014–2015)
 Peđa Jerinić – Smederevo (2010–2012), Hajduk Kula (2012–2013)
 Ognjen Jevtić – Obilić (–2003)
 Igor Joksimović – Zemun (2006–2008)
 Mladen Jovančić – Železnik (2000–2002, 2004–2005)
 Vladimir Jovančić – Rad Beograd (2007–2011), Partizan (2011)–2012), Jagodina (2014–2015)
 Aleksandar Jovanović – OFK Beograd (2005–2007), Hajduk Kula (2007–2011)
 Miodrag Jovanović – BSK Borča (2011–2012)
 Petar Jovanović – Sloboda Užice (2009–2011), Radnički Niš (2013–2014), Voždovac (2015)–2016), Rad Beograd (2015–2016), Čukarički (2016–2017),  Mladost Lučani (2017–2019, 2019–2021)
 Đorđe Kamber – OFK Beograd (2002–2006)
 Dragan Kavaz – Napredak Kruševac (1990–1993)
 Dušan Kerkez – Radnički Obrenovac (2000–2002)
 Nenad Kiso – Čukarički Stankom (2007–2011, 2018–2019), Zemun (2017–2018, 2019–2020)
 Obren Kljajić - Voždovac (2022-2023)
 Arsen Knežević – Rad Beograd (2018–2019)
 Igor Kojić – Bežanija (2006–2007), Smederevo (2009–2010, 2012–2013)
 Jovo Kojić – Novi Pazar (2020–2022)
 Saša Kolunija – Bežanija (2005–2007, (2008)–2009, 2014–2015), Rad Beograd (2013–2014)
 Nikola Kosanić – Mačva Šabac (2018–2019)
 Aleksandar Kosorić – Partizan (2008–2009), Rad Beograd (2009–2011), Radnički Kragujevac (2011–2013), Radnički Niš (2013–2014)
 Stefan Kovač – Čukarički (2018–present)
 Goran Kovačević – Zemun (1992–1994)
 Gojko Kozić – Mladost Apatin (2001–2002)
 Damjan Krajišnik – Mladost Lučani (2019–2020), Metalac G.M. (2020–2022), Radnički Kragujevac (2022-present)
 Rade Krunić – Donji Srem (2012–2014), Borac Čačak (2014–2015)
 Simo Krunić – OFK Beograd (1992–1994), Čukarički Stankom (1996–1997)
 Esad Kuhinja – Napredak Kruševac (1990–1994)
 Luka Kukić - Novi Pazar (2021-2022)
 Miloš Kuljanin – Borac Čačak (2008–2009)
 Petar Kunić – Novi Pazar (2016–2017), Napredak Kruševac (2021–2022), Radnik Surdulica (2022-present)
 Đorđe Kunovac – Bečej (1994–1995), Rad Beograd (1995–1998, 2001–2002)
 Numan Kurdić – Novi Pazar (2020–2021, 2022-present)
 Nenad Kutlačić – Budućnost Banatski Dvor (2003–2004), Banat Zrenjanin (2005–2007)
 Mićo Kuzmanović – Jagodina (2014–2015)
 Nikola Lakić – Dinamo Vranje (2018–2019)
 Miodrag Latinović – Loznica (199_–199_), Spartak Subotica (199_–1999)
 Milivoje Lazić – Zemun (2018–2019)
 Nemanja Lekanić – Sloboda Užice (2013–2014), Mačva Šabac (2015–2018)
 Bojan Letić – Radnički Niš (2019–2020)
 Marinko Mačkić – Mladost Lučani (2000–2003), Vojvodina (2003)–2004)
 Bojan Magazin – Vojvodina (1998–1999)
 Zoran Majstorović – Borac Čačak (1994–1996), Železnik (1997–2004)
 Dejan Maksimović – Zemun (2018–2019)
 Ajdin Maksumić – Sloboda Užice (2012–2013)
 Darko Maletić – Partizan (2006–2008)
 Marko Maletić – Zlatibor Čajetina (2020–2021), Javor Ivanjica (2022–2023)
 Luka Malić - Radnički Kragujevac (2022-present)
 Strahinja Manojlović - Mačva Šabac (2021-2022), Javor Ivanjica (2022-present)
 Damjan Marčeta – Donji Srem (2012–2015)
 Slavko Marić – Hajduk Beograd (2001–2006), Mladost Lučani (2006–2008, 2017–2018), Borac Čačak (2008–2011), Sloboda Užice (2011–2012), Radnički Kragujevac (2012–2014), Jagodina (2015–2016), Novi Pazar (2016–2017), Mačva Šabac (2018–2020)
 Neven Marković – Rad Beograd (2005–2008), Mladost Lučani (2007–(2008)
 Vlado Marković – OFK Beograd (2007–2008)
 Njegoš Matić – Mladost Apatin (2001–2002)
 Dragan Matković – Vojvodina (2017–2020)
 Darjan Matović – Javor Ivanjica (2013–2014)
 Darko Mavrak – Proleter Zrenjanin (1992–1993)
 Marko Mazalica – Rad Beograd (2005–2007), Donji Srem (2014–2015)
 Slobodan Mazić – Spartak Subotica (1999–2001, 2006–2007), OFK Beograd (2001–2002)
 Miodrag Medan – Rad Beograd (1993–1994)
 Miroslav Medan – Sloboda Užice (1995–1996)
 Dragan Mićić – Red Star (1996–2000), Rad Beograd (2000–2002), Banat Zrenjanin (2002–2007)
 Marko Mik – Mladost Lučani (2001–2002)
 Borislav Mikić – Borac Čačak (1999–2000), Železnik (2002–2006), Voždovac (2006)–2007), Banat Zrenjanin (2006–2009)
 Ninoslav Milenković – Mladost Lučani (1996–1998), Hajduk Kula (2001–(2002)
 Zoran Milidrag – Spartak Subotica (1993–1995), Sartid Smederevo (199_–1998)
 Nikola Milinković – Bečej (1991–1993)
 Nenad Miljković – Vojvodina (1994–1995, 1996–1997, 1998–1999), Spartak Subotica (1997–1998), Red Star (1999–2001), Sartid Smederevo (2001–200_)
 Milenko Milošević – Loznica (1996–1998), Red Star (1998–2000)
 Miroslav Milutinović – Vojvodina (2006–2010), Hajduk Kula (2012–2013)
 Zoran Milutinović – Voždovac (2017–2018)
 Igor Mišan – OFK Beograd (2007–2010), Spartak Subotica (2010–2011), Radnik Surdulica (2016–2017)
 Jovo Mišeljić – Radnički Niš (1992–1995, 2001–2003)
 Nenad Mišković – Radnički Beograd (1993–1997), Proleter Zrenjanin (1998–1999), Partizan (1999–2004), Rad Beograd (2005–(2006), Mladost Apatin (2006–2007), Banat Zrenjanin (2007–2008)
 Slaviša Mitrović – Bečej (1994–1996)
 Marko Mitrušić – Metalac G.M. (2011–2012)
 Siniša Mladenović – Radnik Surdulica (2016–2018), Zemun (2018–2019)
 Aleksa Mrđa – Voždovac (2017–2018)
 Marko Mrgud – OFK Beograd (2013–2014)
 Momčilo Mrkaić – Zemun (2011–2013, 2018–2019), Javor Ivanjica (2017–2018, (2019)–2020), Vojvodina (2019–2022)
 Dragan Mučibabić – Rad Beograd (1992–1993)
 Mustafa Mujezinović - Novi Pazar (2021–2023)
 Denis Mujkić – Novi Pazar (2012–2013)
 Siniša Mulina – Bečej (1993–1996), Partizan (1996–1997), Milicionar Beograd (1997–2001), Vojvodina (2000–(2001)
 Bojan Nastić – Vojvodina (2011–2016)
 Nenad Nikić - Voždovac (2022–present)
 Nemanja Nikolić – Radnički Niš (2019–2020)
 Staniša Nikolić – Vojvodina (2004–2005)
 Stevo Nikolić – Obilić (2002–2005)
 Vladimir Nosović – Hajduk Kula (2002–2003)
 Nenad Novaković – Borac Čačak (2007–2009)
 Slobo Novaković – Vojvodina (1997–1998)
 Amer Osmanagić – OFK Beograd (2008–2009, 2011–2012), Novi Pazar (2015–2016)
 Branko Ostojić – Javor Ivanjica (2010–2013), Voždovac (2018–2019)
 Ljubiša Pecelj – Kolubara Lazarevac (2019–2020,2021–2022), Metalac G.M. (2020–2021), Radnički Kragujevac (2022–present)
 Milan Pecelj – Radnički Niš (1998–2000), Hajduk Kula (2000–2002)
 Srđan Pecelj – Red Star (1992–1993, 1995–1996, 1997–1999), Čukarički Stankom (1996–1997, 1999–2000)
 Nebojša Pejić – BSK Borča (2006–2011)
 Bojan Petrić – Novi Pazar (2011)–2012)
 Ognjen Petrović – Javor Ivanjica (2012–2013)
 Todor Petrović – Voždovac (2014–2019), Radnički Niš (2020–2022)
 Siniša Peulić – Hajduk Kula (199_–1995)
 Miloš Pojić – Hajduk Kula (199_–1998)
 Željko Polak – Milicionar Beograd (1998–1999), Radnički Beograd (1999–2000, 2001–2004), Bežanija (2004–2006, 2006–2008)
 Dajan Ponjević - Bačka Bačka Palanka (2014-2021), Radnički Kragujevac (2022–present)
 Nikola Popara – Spartak Subotica (2012–2013), Vojvodina (2013–2014), Jagodina (2014–2015)
 Ilija Prodanović – Bečej (1996–1997)
 Dario Purić – OFK Beograd (2007–2008), Sloboda Užice (2012–2014)
 Hakim Puteš – Bečej (1997–1999)
 Bojan Puzigaća – Voždovac (2015–2017)
 Darko Raca – Zemun (1997–1998)
 Saša Raca – Mladost Apatin (1996–1998), Zemun (1998–2000, 2001–2002)
 Čedomir Radić – Metalac G.M. (2016–2017)
 Samir Radovac - Novi Pazar (2022-present)
 Slaviša Radović – Vojvodina (2014–2016), Voždovac (2016–2017)
 Radoslav Radulović – Zemun (1995–1998, 2000–2002), Rad Beograd (2001–(2002)
 Amar Rahmanović – Novi Pazar (2012–2013)
 Dragan Rajović – Obilić (199_–), OFK Beograd (–2003)
 Zoran Rajović – Vojvodina (1996–1999, 2000–2002), Hajduk Kula (2008–2009)
 Sead Ramović – Novi Pazar (2011)–2012)
 Admir Raščić – Novi Pazar (2011–2013)
 Haris Redžepi – Novi Pazar (2012–2014)
 Igor Remetić – Proleter Zrenjanin (199_–), Zemun (–2002)
 Ševkija Resić – Novi Pazar (2020–2021)
 Ilija Ristanić – Napredak Kruševac (2009–2010)
 Predrag Ristanović - Novi Pazar (2022–present)
 Ivan Ristić – Vojvodina (1997–2001), Rad Beograd (2001–2002)
 Edin Rustemović – OFK Beograd (2012–2013), Radnik Surdulica (2022–present)
 Branislav Ružić – Mladost Lučani (2016–2017)
 Damir Sadiković - Kolubara Lazarevac (2022–present)
 Duško Sakan – Rad Beograd (2011–(2012)
 Siniša Saničanin – Mladost Lučani (2015–2017), Vojvodina (2017-2021), Partizan (2021–present)
 Stefan Santrač – TSC Bačka Topola (2020–2022)
 Boris Savić – Rad Beograd (2009–2010)
 Milan Savić – Čukarički (2019–2022), Mladost GAT (2022-present)
 Miljan Sekulović – Vojvodina (1991–1992), Borac Čačak (1995–2000)
 Armin Smajić – OFK Kikinda (1987–1988, 1992–1993)
 Milan Srećo – Partizan (2004–2005), Banat Zrenjanin (2008–2010)
 Filip Sredojević – OFK Beograd (2014–2015)
 Duško Stajić – Sloboda Užice (2012–2013)
 Milan Stanivuković – Bečej (1996–1999)
 Slobodan Stanojlović – Partizan (2019–2021), TSC Bačka Topola (2021–2022), Novi Pazar (2022-present)
 Miroslav Stefanović – Rad Beograd (1990–1991), Zemun (1991–1992), Čukarički (1992–1993)
 Miroslav Stevanović – Vojvodina (2010–2013)
 Saša Stević – Borac Čačak (2001–2006), Banat Zrenjanin (2008–2010)
 Nikola Stijaković – BSK Borča (2009–2011), Spartak Subotica (2011–2013)
 Jovica Stokić – BSK Borča (2011–2012)
 Nenad Studen – Partizan (1999–2000)
 Boško Stupić – Novi Pazar (2015)–2016)
 Aleksandar Subić – Partizan (2015–2016, 2018–2019), Radnički Niš (2017–2018) 
 Nemanja Supić – Železnik (2002–2004), Zemun (2005–2007), Javor Ivanjica (2008–2009, 2010–2011), Vojvodina (2011–2013), Novi Pazar (2013)–2014), Voždovac (2013–2015), Red Star (2015–2019)
 Zoran Šaraba – Vojvodina (1990–1997), Budućnost Valjevo (1997–1998)

 Miloš Šatara – Mladost Lučani (2015–2021)
 Stefan Šavija – Vojvodina (2017–2021)
 Ognjen Škorić – Donji Srem (2012–2013)
 Nebojša Šodić – Hajduk Kula (2006–2008)
 Neđo Šuka – Donji Srem (2013–2014)
 Zoran Šupić – OFK Beograd (2002–2007), Bežanija (2006)–2007), Novi Pazar (2011)–2012), BSK Borča (2011–2012, 2013–2015)
 Marko Šušnjar - TSC Bačka Topola (2021-2022, 2022-present)
 Bojan Tadić – OFK Beograd (2000–2002)
 Izzy Tandir – Javor Ivanjica (2016–2017)
 Dobrica Tegeltija – Vojvodina (2016–2019)
 Amir Teljigović – Proleter Zrenjanin (1986–1992, 2000–2002), Vojvodina (1992–1994)
 Danilo Teodorović - Voždovac (2022–present)
 Borislav Terzić – Donji Srem (2012–2013), Sloboda Užice (2013–2014), Radnički Kragujevac (2014–2015), Voždovac (2015–2016), Javor Ivanjica (2016–2018), Zemun (2018–2019)
 Pero Tešić – Bačka Bačka Palanka (2018–2019)
 Mirko Todorović – Proleter Zrenjanin (199_–199_), Hajduk Beograd (1999–2000)
 Kristijan Tojčić - Mačva Šabac (2021-2022), Javor Ivanjica (2022–present)
 Jovica Toljagić – Čukarički Stankom (2001–2003)
 Borislav Topić – BSK Borča (2006–2010), Novi Pazar (2012–2013)
 Anid Travančić – Novi Pazar (2016)–2017), Radnički Niš (2016–2018)
 Filip Trivan – Priština (1997–1999)
 Vule Trivunović – Obilić (1999–2002, 2003–2004)
 Bojan Trkulja – Obilić (200_–2002)
 Stefan Udovičić – Čukarički Stankom (2010–2011), Radnički Kragujevac (2011–2012)
 Nikola Valentić – OFK Beograd (2000–2002), Jagodina (2012–2013), Radnički Niš (2014–2015)
 Dragan Vasić – Sartid Smederevo (1997–1998)
 Aleksandar Vasiljević – Bežanija (2005–2008), Mladi Radnik (2008–2010), Jagodina (2010–2012), Hajduk Kula (2011–(2012), Novi Pazar (2012–2013), Donji Srem (2013)–2014), Voždovac (2013–(2014), Napredak Kruševac (2014)–2015)
 Dražen Vasiljević – Borac Čačak (2004–2005)
 Nikola Vasiljević – BSK Borča (2010–2011), Voždovac (2013–2014)
 Zoran Vasiljević – Sloboda Užice (1992–1995), Loznica (199_–199_)
 Predrag Videkanić – Hajduk Kula (2005–2006)
 Aleksandar Vidović – Spartak Subotica (2019–present)
 Saša Vidović – Zemun (2003–2007, 2010–2011), Rad Beograd (2007–2010)
 Predrag Vladić – Zlatibor Čajetina (2020–2021)
 Darko Vojvodić – Loznica (1994–1995), Radnički Kragujevac (1995–1998), Sartid Smederevo (1998–2000), Milicionar Beograd (2000–2001)
 Milorad Vranješ – Sloboda Užice (1994–1996)
 Ognjen Vranješ – Red Star (2008–2009), Napredak Kruševac (2009–2010)
 Stojan Vranješ – Vojvodina (2012–2014)
 Aleksandar Vrhovac – Spartak Subotica (1995–1998)
 Jovan Vujanić – Sloboda Užice (2011)–2012)
 Igor Vujanović – Borac Čačak (1995–1998), Obilić (1999)–2000), Železnik (2000–2001)
 Slavko Vujić – Rad Beograd (1997–2001)
 Filip Vujović – Rad Beograd (2015–2016)
 Dragan Vukajlović – Zemun (2001–2002)
 Svetozar Vukašinović – Proleter Zrenjanin (1999–2000)
 Milenko Vukčević – Spartak Subotica (1992–1993)
 Goran Vukliš – Vojvodina (2020–2022), Radnik Surdulica (2022-present)
 Dejan Vukomanović – BSK Borča (2011–2012, 2019–2020)
 Aleksandar Vuković – Partizan (1999–2000), Milicionar Beograd (2000–2001)
 Goran Zakarić – Partizan (2018–2019)
 Almedin Ziljkić – Donji Srem (2014–2015), Novi Pazar (2015–2016)
 Damir Zlomislić – Vojvodina (2018–2019)
 Milija Žižić – Javor Ivanjica (2002–2003)
 Marko Žulj - Spartak Subotica (2021-2022)

Bosnian internationals that played in Serbian top league clubs only during Yugoslav period:
 Elvir Bolić – Red Star (1991–1992)
 Husref Musemić – Red Star (1985–1989)
 Fahrudin Omerović – Partizan (1984–1992)
 Admir Smajić – Partizan (1979–1988)
 Nermin Šabić – Red Star (1991–1992)

Brazil 

 Adilson (Adilson dos Santos) – Red Star (1997–1998)
 Adriano Strack (Adriano Guerra Strack) – Novi Pazar (2015–2016)
 Aílton (Aílton Gonçalves da Silva) – Red Star (2006–2007)
 Anderson Costa (Anderson José de Jesús Costa) – Rad Beograd (2002–2003)
 Anderson Marques (Anderson Marques de Oliveira) – Partizan (2011–2012)
 Andrezinho (André Reinaldo de Souza Esposito) – Borac Čačak (2009–2010)
 Bruno Matos (Bruno Oliveira de Matos) – Novi Pazar (2014–2015, 2015–(2016), Red Star (2015)–2016)
 Cadú (Carlos Eduardo de Fiori Mendes) – Red Star (2009–2013)
 Jonathan Cafú (Jonathan Renato Barbosa) – Red Star (2018–2019)
 Caio (Caio Henrique Siqueira Sanchez) – Radnički Niš (2013–2014)
 Cauê (Roberto Carvalho Cauê) – OFK Beograd (2009–2010)
 Cléo (Cleverson Gabriel Cordova) – Red Star (2008–2009), Partizan (2009–2011)
 Cristian (Cristian Daniel Dal Bello Fagundes) - Mladost GAT (2022-present)
 Edgar (Edgar Bruno da Silva) – Red Star (2008–2009)
 Edison (Edison Alves do Amaral) – Radnički Kragujevac (2001–2002)
 Edson Silva (Edson José da Silva) – Red Star (2015–2016)
 Eduardo (Eduardo Ferreira Abdo Pacheco) – Partizan (2011–2013)
 Eliomar (Eliomar Correia Silva) – Javor Ivanjica (2008–2012, 2015–2018,2021–present), Partizan (2012–2013), Mladost Lučani (2019–2020), Inđija (2020)–2021), Zlatibor Čajetina (2020–2021)
 Ely Thadeu (Ely Thadeu Bravin Rangel) – Red Star (2006–2007), Bežanija (2007–2008)
 Emerson Brito (Emerson Rodrigues Brito) - Javor Ivanjica (2022-present)
 Endelson (Endelson Posipon Edu) – Sartid Smederevo (1997–1998)
 Evandro (Evandro da Silva) – Proleter Novi Sad (2021–2022), Radnički Kragujevac (2022–present)
 Evandro Goebel – Red Star (2010–2012)
 Everton Luiz (Everton Luiz Guimarães Bilher) – Partizan (2015–2018)
 Fabinho Mauá (Fabio Moises Rosa) – OFK Beograd (2003–2004)
 Fábio Silva (Fabio Carleandro da Silva) – Rad Beograd (2002–2005, 2006–2007), Red Star (2005)–2006), Hajduk Kula (2005–(2006), Napredak Kruševac (2007–2008)
 Fabrício (Fabrício Silva Dornellas) – Partizan (2015–2016)
 Richard Falcão aka Rei (Richard Amorim Falcão) – Novi Pazar (2014–2015)
 Felipe Ferreira (Felipe de Figueiredo Ferreira) – Javor Ivanjica (2015–2016)
 Ferreira (Josiesley Ferreira Rosa) – Red Star (2008–2009)
 Fumaça (José Gomes Fumaça) – Red Star (1998–1999)
 Gefferson Goulart (Gefferson da Silva Goulart) – Železnik (2003–2005)
 Godoy (Rafael Godoy Pereira) – Banat Zrenjanin (2008–2009)
 Guiba (Guilherme Humberto da Silveira) – Red Star (1997–1998)
 Jander (Jander Ribeiro Santana) – Red Star (2019–2020)
 Jatobá (Carlos Roberto Jatobá) – Spartak Subotica (1990–1991)
 Jean Carioca (Jean da Silva Duarte) – OFK Beograd (2002–2003)
 Jeff Silva (Jefferson da Silva Nascimento) – Red Star (2008–2009)
 Jefferson Batista (Jefferson Alexandre Batista) – Vojvodina (2008–2009)
 João Paulo (João Paulo Santos de Oliveira Gomes) – Smederevo (2012–2013)
 Juca (Juliano Roberto Antonello) – Partizan (2007–2009)
 Leandro Montebeler (Leandro Rodrigues Montebeler) – Vojvodina (2008–2009), Napredak Kruševac (2009–2010)
 Leandro Netto (Leandro Netto de Macedo) – OFK Beograd (2001–2004)
 Leandro Pinto (Leandro Climaco Pinto) – Proleter Novi Sad (2018–2021), TSC Bačka Topola (2021–2022), Radnik Surdulica (2022-2023)
 Leonardo (Leonardo da Silva Souza) – Partizan (2016–2017)
 Lucas (Lucas Marques da Silva) – Smederevo (2012–2013)
 Lucas Piasentin – Čukarički (2013–2017)
 Marcinho (Marcio Teruel) – Jagodina (2012–2013)
 Marcos (Marcos Fernando Souza Cilia) – OFK Beograd (2003–2004)
 Marquinhos (Marco Antonio Carmo Anjos) – Spartak Subotica (1990–1991)
 Mateus (Mateus Lima Cruz) – Borac Čačak (2017–2018)
 Bruno Mezenga (Bruno Ferreira Mombra Rosa) – Red Star (2011–2012)
 Osvaldo Monteiro – Spartak Subotica (1990–1991)
 Gabriel Neves (Gabriel Vinicius Neves) – BSK Borča (2012–2013)
 Vinícius Pacheco (Vinícius Pacheco dos Santos) – Red Star (2011–2012)
 Picon (Fernando Picon da Silva) – OFK Beograd (2002–2003)
 Marcelo Pletsch (Marcelo José Pletsch) – Vojvodina (2009–2010)
 Rafael Carioca (Rafael Felipe Barreto) – Banat Zrenjanin (2008–2010)
 Renan (Renan Oliveira do Vale) – Smederevo (2009–2010)
 Renan (Renan da Silva Alves) – Vojvodina (2017–2018)
 Ricardinho (Ricardo Silva de Almeida) – Sloboda Užice (2010–2011)
 Ricardinho (Ricardo Cavalcante Mendes) – Red Star (2017–2018)
 Richard (Richard dos Santos de Almeida) - Čukarički (2022-present)
 Rivan (Rivanilton de França) – Rad Beograd (2001–2003), Hajduk Beograd (2002–(2003)
 Ronaldo Viana (Ronaldo Aparecido Viana) – Železnik (2003–2005)
 Rudison (Rudison Nogueira Ferreira) – Borac Čačak (2001–2002), OFK Beograd (2002–2003)
 Pedro Sass Petrazzi – Borac Čačak (2015–2016)
 Sávio (Sávio Oliveira do Vale) – Red Star (2009–2012)
 Raúl Simplício – Sartid Smederevo (1997–1998)
 Tai (Taianan Imbere Linhares Welker) – Napredak Kruševac (2014–2015)
 Taigo (Taigo Vital Amorim de Araujo) – Dinamo Vranje (2018–2019)
 Tiago (Tiago Galvão da Silva) – Sloboda Užice (2010–2014), Čukarički (2015–2016), Borac Čačak (2016–2017)
 Tiago (Tiago Freitas da Gama Alves) – Banat Zrenjanin (2007–2008)
 Tom (Wellington Camargo do Nascimento) – Rad Beograd (2013–2014)
 Vítor Hugo (Vitor Hugo Manique de Jesus) – Partizan (2007–2008)
 Mateus Viveiros (Mateus Viveiros Andrade) – Red Star (2016–2017)
 Washington (Washington Roberto Mariano da Silva) – Partizan (2008–2010), Borac Čačak (2010–2011)
 William (William Artur de Oliveira) – OFK Beograd (2007–2009)
 William Alves (William Rocha Alves) – Borac Čačak (2008–2012)
 Willians (Willians Bartolomeu dos Santos) – Red Star (1998–1999)
 Zé Luis (José Luis Boscolo) – Sartid Smederevo (1997–1998)
 Zé Marcos (José Marcos Alves Luis) – Rad Beograd (2017–2018)

Brunei 
 Arsen Marjan – Zvezdara (1998–1999, 2001–2002), Železnik (2003–2004), Radnički Beograd (2004–2005)

Bulgaria 

 Todor Atanaskov – Red Star (1946–1948)
 Ivan Bandalovski – Partizan (2014–2016)
 Valeri Bojinov – Partizan (2015–2017)
 Kostadin Gadzhalov – Borac Čačak (2010–2011)
 Blagoy Georgiev – Red Star (2006–2007)
 Ivan Ivanov – Partizan (2011–2013)
 Zoran Janković – Železnik (1996–1998), Vojvodina (1998–2000), Inđija (2009–2011)
 Anton Kuzmanov – Jedinstvo Beograd (1939–1941)
 Angel Manolov – Hajduk Kula (2009–2012)
 Asen Nikolov – Partizan (2006–2007)
 Predrag Pažin – Partizan (1994–1999)
 Radanov – Mitić Beograd (1942–1943)
 Petar Shopov – Železnik (2001–2004)
 Blagoy Simeonov – OFK Beograd (1946–1947)
 Dragoljub Simonović – Obilić (1997–1999)
 Kiril Simonovski – Partizan (1945–1950)
 Yanaki Smirnov – Metalac G.M. (2016–2017)
 Metodi Tomanov – Radnički Niš (1990–1992)
 Iliyan Yordanov – Borac Čačak (2015–2016)

Burkina Faso 
 Dramane Salou – Partizan (2017–2018)

Cameroon 

 Macky Bagnack – Partizan (2020–2021)
 Regis Baha – Napredak Kruševac (2018–2020), Mladost Lučani (2020–present)
 Pierre Boya – Partizan (2003–2007, 2010–2011)
 Eric Djemba-Djemba – Partizan (2013–2014)
 Thierry Ekwalla – Čukarički Stankom (2004–2005)
 Thierry Etongou - Radnički Niš (2022–present)
 Fokim Fon Fondo – BSK Borča (2012–2013)
 Ferdinand Fru Fon – Dinamo Vranje (2018–2019)
 Patrick Kamgaing – Javor Ivanjica (2012–2013)
 Daniel Kamy – Inđija (2020–2021)
 Noé Kwin – Spartak Subotica (2012–2013)
 John Mary – Vojvodina (2014–2016)
 Bernard Mbassi – Rad Beograd (2002–2003)
 Donald Molls - Kolubara Lazarevac (2022-present)
 Alexis N'Gambi – Partizan (2008–2009)
 Jacques Nguemaleu – Napredak Kruševac (2009–2010)
 Idriss Nguessi – Novi Pazar (2012–2013)
 Aboubakar Oumarou – Red Star (2008–2009), OFK Beograd (2009–2010), Vojvodina (2010–2013), Partizan (2015–2016), Napredak Kruševac (2019–2021)
 Claude Rygan – Partizan (2003–2004)
 Jacques Ekangue Tabi – Hajduk Kula (2012–2013)
 Léandre Tawamba – Partizan (2016–2018)
 Didier Tayou – Sloboda Užice (2011–2013)
 Michel Vaillant Mbiobe – Napredak Kruševac (2014–2015), Mladost Lučani (2015–2018)
 Ibrahim Walidjo – Javor Ivanjica (2012–2015)
 Basile Yamkam – Radnički Niš (2021–present)

Canada 

 Milan Borjan – Rad Beograd (2009–2011), Radnički Niš (2014–2015), Red Star (2017–present)
 Milan Božić – Zvezdara (2001–2002, 2013–2015), Hajduk Beograd (2002–2005)
 Nikola Bursać – TSC Bačka Topola (2019–2022), Spartak Subotica (2022–present)
 Stefan Cebara – Rad Beograd (2009–2010), Vojvodina (2017–2018)
 Derek Cornelius – Javor Ivanjica (2016–2019)
 Srdjan Djekanović – Zemun (2001–2003), Radnički Obrenovac (2002–(2003)
 Dejan Jakovic – Red Star (2008–2009)
 Boban Kajgo – Smederevo (2009–2010)
 Jovan Lučić – Rad Beograd (2014–2015, 2021–present)
 Aleksa Marković – Zemun (2015–2016, 2017–2018)
 Mario Ostojić – Milicionar Beograd (1998–1999), Red Star (2000–2001)
 Igor Prostran – Borac Čačak (2002–2004)
 Mike Stojanovic – Radnički Kragujevac (1969–1973)

Cape Verde 
  Patrick Andrade - Partizan (2022–present)
 Ricardo Gomes – Partizan (2018–2019.2021–present)

Central African Republic 
 David Manga – Partizan (2011–2012)

Chad 
 Misdongarde Betolngar – Red Star (2007–2008), Metalac G.M. (2009–2012)

Chile 
 Mario Berrios – OFK Beograd (2006–2007)
 Sebastián Guerrero – Čukarički (2013–2014)

China 
 Cheng Mouyi – Spartak Subotica (2010–2011)
 Dong Li – Metalac G.M. (2019–2021)
 Jia Xiuquan – Partizan (1987–1989)
 Li Chunyu – Rad Beograd (2009–2010)
 Li Siqi – Inđija (2019–2020)
 Liu Haiguang – Partizan (1987–1989)
 Runze Hao – Radnički Niš (2019–2020)
 Yuan Xue – Radnik Surdulica (2016–2017)
 Wang Lei – Mladost Lučani (2017–2018)
 Zhong Haoran – Spartak Subotica (2016–2017), Borac Čačak (2017–2018)

Chinese Taipei (Taiwan) 
 Tim Chow – Spartak Subotica (2018–2019)

Colombia 
 Andrés Colorado - Partizan (2022-present)
 Haider Landázuri – Proleter Novi Sad (2021–2022)
 Cristian Martínez Borja – Red Star (2010–2012)
 Mauricio Molina – Red Star (2007–2008)
 Dilan Ortiz – Čukarički (2019–2020), Mačva Šabac (2020–2021), Proleter Novi Sad (2021–2022)
 Nélson Pizarro – OFK Beograd (2006–2007)

Comoros 

 Ben (El Fardou Mohamed Ben Nabouhane) – Red Star (2017–2023)

Congo 

 Scott Bitsindou – Javor Ivanjica (2017–2018)
 Prestige Mboungou – Metalac G.M. (2019–2021,2021-2022)
 Poba Yubu Touré – Borac Čačak (2016–2017)

Congo D.R. 
 Francis Masiya – Borac Čačak (2016–2017)
 Ibrahim Somé Salombo – Bežanija (2007–2008), Red Star (2008–2009)

Costa Rica 
 John Jairo Ruiz – Red Star (2016–2017)

Côte d'Ivoire 
 Herve Amani – Javor Ivanjica (2017–2019)
 Ismaël Béko Fofana – Partizan (2013–2016), Čukarički (2016–2018), Vojvodina (2018–2019)
 Cèdric Gogoua – Partizan (2015–2017)
 Ismaël Maïga - Radnički Niš (2022-present)
 Marcel Metoua – Banat Zrenjanin (2008–2011)
 Salia Ouattara – Mladost Lučani (2014–2015)
 Sékou Sanogo – Red Star (2019–2023)

Croatia
Excluded the players that played before 1991 when Croatia became independent.

 Ivan Aleksić – Jagodina (2014–2015)
 Dražen Bagarić - Kolubara Lazarevac (2022-present)
 Gavro Bagić – Hajduk Kula (2010–2011)
 Mario Barić – Vojvodina (2013–2014)
 Slavko Bralić – Vojvodina (2019–2021)
 Boro Cvetković – Borac Čačak (1994–1995)
 Dražen Cvjetković – Čukarički Stankom (1991–1994), Hajduk Kula (1994–1998)
 Josip Čalušić – TSC Bačka Topola (2021–present)
 Matej Delač – Vojvodina (2013–2014)
 Igor Dević – OFK Beograd (2004–2007), Napredak Kruševac (2008–2009)
 Dragan Dobrić – Hajduk Kula (2008–2009)
 Duško Dukić – Jagodina (2007)–2008, 2010–2014, 2016–2017), Hajduk Kula (2007–2010), Voždovac (2013–(2014), Spartak Subotica (2014–2015)
 Lazo Džepina – Rad Beograd (1990–1995)
 Aleksandar Glamočak – Vojvodina (2000–2001)
 Dejan Godar – Spartak Subotica (1996–1997), Vojvodina (1998–1999)
 Ivica Gvozden – Rad Beograd (1990–1993)
 Ronald Habi – OFK Kikinda (1996–1998), Vojvodina (1998–2002)
 Nebojša Ivančević – Bačka Bačka Palanka (2020–2021)
 Tomislav Ivičić – Napredak Kruševac (2014–2015)
 Radovan Ivković – Bačka Bačka Palanka (2008–2010, 2012–2018)
 Saša Jelovac – Zemun (1999–2000)
 Veldin Karić – Vojvodina (1992–1993)
 Ante Knezović – Zemun (2017–2018)
 Ivan Konjević – Zemun (199_–1994)
 Nikica Maglica – Proleter Zrenjanin (1988–1992)
 Davor Magoč – Vojvodina (2003–2004)
 Vinko Malenica – Vojvodina (1998–1999)
 Slavko Mandić – Spartak Subotica (199_–1998)
 Ljubomir Marčić – Hajduk Kula (1991–1993)
 Milan Maričić – Rad Beograd (1991–1992)
 Dušan Martić – Mladost Apatin (2005–2007)
 Milenko Milićević – Zemun (1991–1993)
 Miloš Mišić – Hajduk Kula (2010–2011)
 Ante Mitrović – Metalac G.M. (2015–2017)
 Mario Nikolić – Mačva Šabac (2020–2021)
 Milan Pavličić – Radnički Niš (2012–2013)
 Luka Pisačić – Bačka Bačka Palanka (2020–2021)
 Predrag Počuča – Železnik (2003–2004)
 Dejan Poljaković – Spartak Subotica (1997–2001)
 Denis Prtenjača – Čukarički (1996–2000)
 Ivan Radoš – Radnički Kragujevac (2021–2022)
 Hrvoje Rizvanović – Vojvodina (2017–2019)
 Goran Skeledžić – Spartak Subotica (1991–1994)
 Zoran Stamenić – Mladost Apatin (2005–2007)
 Dajan Šimac – Jagodina (2013–2015)
 Marko Šimić – Jagodina (2010–2012), Radnički Kragujevac (2013)–2014), Novi Pazar (2013–(2014)
 Marko Šimić - Radnički Kragujevac (2022–2023)
 Filip Tomašković –  Spartak Subotica (2021–2022)
 Mile Vujasin – Mačva Šabac (2019–2020), Inđija (2020–2021)
 Ante Vukušić - Kolubara Lazarevac (2022–present)

Croatian internationals that played in Serbian top league clubs only during Yugoslav period:
 Ivan Cvjetković – Rad Beograd (1985–1986)
 Goran Jurić – Red Star (1987–1991)
 Ardian Kozniku – Priština (1988–1990)
 Robert Prosinečki – Red Star (1987–1991)
 Kujtim Shala – Partizan (1983–1984), Priština (1984–1989)
 Ivo Šeparović – Spartak Subotica (1984–1985)

Players that represented NDH (Independent State of Croatia):
 Miroslav Brozović – Partizan (1946–1948)
 Zlatko Čajkovski – Partizan (1946–1955)
 Ernest Dubac – BSK Beograd (1937–1940)
 Svetozar Džanić – Vojvodina (1934–1936)
 Franjo Glaser – BSK Beograd (1933–1937), Partizan (1945–1947)
 Ivan Jazbinšek – BSK Beograd (1935–1938)
 Gustav Lechner – BSK Beograd (1934–1941)
 Antun Lokošek – Naša Krila Zemun (1947–1948)
 Florijan Matekalo – Partizan (1946–1947)
 Antun Pogačnik – Jugoslavija (193_–193_)

Curaçao 
 Richairo Živković - Red Star (2021-2022)

Cyprus 
 Nikolas Asprogenis – Partizan (2004–2007)
 Siniša Gogić – Radnički Niš (1982–1987), Rad Beograd (1987–1989)
 Alexander Spoljaric – OFK Beograd (2014–2017)
 Milenko Spoljaric – OFK Beograd (1989–1992)
 Vladan Tomić – Radnički Niš (1990–1991)

Czech Republic 
Including Bohemia and Czechoslovakia.
 Josef Bener – BSK Beograd (1911–1912)
 Nikola Beneš – Građanski Niš (1935–1936)
 Vladan Binić - Napredak Kruševac (2007-2010), Rad Star (2010-2011), Radnički Kragujevac (2011)-2012), Spartak Subotica (2011-(2012), Radnički Niš (2012-2013)
 Josef Čapek – Vojvodina (1919–1921)
 Miloš Eckert – Srpski mač (1907–1911), BSK Beograd (1911–1914, 1918–1923)
 František Haas – NAK Novi Sad (1935–1939), Vojvodina (1940–1941)
 Otto Kohout – Srpski mač (1911), BSK Beograd (1911–1913)
 František Kotrba – NAK Novi Sad (1935–1937)
 Alois Machek – Jugoslavija (1913–1914, 1918–1926)
 Eduard Mifek – Velika Srbija (1913–1914)
 Josef Papo – Srpski mač (1908–1911), BSK Beograd (1911–1912)
 Václav Petrovický – Jugoslavija (1913–1914, 1918–1921)
 Tomáš Poláček – Sloboda Užice (2010–2011)
 Josef Švácha – Srpski mač (1911), BSK Beograd (1911–1914)
 Batko Voves – Mitić Beograd (1942–1943)

Denmark 
 Andrija Rajović – Spartak Subotica (2020–2021,2021-2022)

Ecuador

 Augusto Batioja – Inđija (2010)–2011), OFK Beograd (2010–2013), Radnički Niš (2014–2015)
 Walberto Caicedo – Metalac G.M. (2015–2017)
 Segundo Castillo – Red Star (2006–2008)
 José Gutiérrez – Novi Pazar (2014–2015)
 Jainer Medina – Spartak Subotica (2017–2018)
 José Mina – Novi Pazar (2014–2015)
 Franklin Salas – Red Star (2007–2008)

Egypt 
 Ahmed Bogy - Dinamo Vranje (2018-2019)

El Salvador 
 Vladan Vicevic – Sloboda Užice (1986–1992, 1999–2002), Bečej (1992–1995)

Estonia 
 Mark Oliver Roosnupp - Napredak Kruševac (2022-present)

Finland 
 Lauri Dalla Valle – Zemun (2017–2018)

France 

 Jean-Christophe Bahebeck – Partizan (2020–2022)
 Axel Bakayoko – Red Star (2020–2022)
 Ivan Bek – BSK Beograd (1925–1928)
 Maxime Benayer – BSK Beograd (1923–1924)
 Loïs Diony – Red Star (2021–2022)
 Boubacari Doucouré – Javor Ivanjica (2020–2021,2022–present), TSC Bačka Topola (2021–2022)
 Maka Gakou - Radnički Niš (2022–present)
 Goran Jerković – Jagodina (2015–2016)
 Damien Le Tallec – Red Star (2015–2018)
 David Milinković – Rad Beograd (2012–2013)
 Marko Muslin – Red Star (2003–2004)
 Sacha Petshi – Sloboda Užice (2013–2014)
 Nikola Stojanović – Napredak Kruševac (2020–2021)
 Banfa Sylla – Rad Beograd (2011–2012)

Gabon 

 Anselme Délicat – Vojvodina (1983–1986)
 Guélor Kanga – Red Star (2016–2018,2020–present)

Gambia 
 Muhammed Badamosi - Čukarički (2022–present)
 Adama Jarjue – Zlatibor Čajetina (2020–2021)
 Modou Jobe – Inđija (2020–2021)
 Ousman Marong - Radnik Surdulica (2022–present)

Georgia 
 Irakli Azarovi - Red Star (2022–present)
 Irakli Goginashvili – Novi Pazar (2015–2016)
 Mikheil Khutsishvili – Vojvodina (2008–2010)
 Davit Kokhia – Vojvodina (2014–2015)
 Giorgi Merebashvili – Vojvodina (2009–2012)
 Giorgi Papunashvili - Radnički Niš (2022–2023)
 Anton Tolordava - Radnički Niš (2022-2023)

Germany 
Including West Germany from 1949 to 1990.

 Alexander Arsovic – OFK Beograd (2002–2003), Red Star (2004–2005)
 Erich Feldmann – BUSK Beograd (1924–1925)
 Nikola Ilić – Borac Čačak (2016–2017)
 Janko David Jeremic - Radnicki Kragujevac (2021-2022)
 Luka Losic – Voždovac (2017–2019)
 Marko Marin – Red Star (2018–2020)
 Gustav Mut – Grafičar Beograd (1931–1932)
 Radomir Novaković – Inđija (2020–2021)
 Karl Otterbein – Bačka Subotica (193x–1949)
 Aleksandro Petrovic – Zemun (2006–2008), Čukarički Stankom (2007–(2008)
 Matthias Predojević – Milicionar Beograd (1997–1999), Vojvodina (2001–2002)
 Robert Puha – Spartak Subotica (1989–1990)
 Thomas Vasov – Borac Čačak (1993–1996)

Ghana 

 Sadick Abubakar - Radnik Surdulica (2022–present)
 Sadick Adams – Vojvodina (2009–2010)
 Addoquaye Addo – Red Star (2007–2008)
 Edmund Addo - Spartak Subotica (2022-present)
 Lee Addy – Red Star (2010–2012), Čukarički (2015–2016)
 Dominic Adiyiah – Partizan (2010–2011)
 Francis Afriyie – Vojvodina (2016–2018)
 Samuel Afum – Spartak Subotica (2018–2019)

 Gershon Akuffo – Napredak Kruševac (2009–2010)
 Karim Alhassan – Radnički Kragujevac (2013–2014)
 Yaw Antwi – Napredak Kruševac (2009–2010), Vojvodina (2010–2013), Metalac G.M. (2011–(2012)
 Bismarck Appiah – Bačka Bačka Palanka (2016–2017), Mladost Lučani (2017–2018)
 Eric Appiah – Metalac G.M. (2021–2022)
 Stephen Appiah – Vojvodina (2011–2012)
 Alfred Arthur – Jagodina (2008–2009)
 Kennedy Asamoah – Borac Čačak (2016–2017)
 Nathaniel Asamoah – Red Star (2011–2013)
 Jonas Asare – Javor Ivanjica (2016–2018)
 Joseph Bempah – Vojvodina (2016–2018), Proleter Novi Sad (2018–2019)
 Richmond Boakye – Red Star (2016–2018, 2018–2021)
 Kennedy Boateng – Jagodina (2008–2010)
 Kwame Boateng – Metalac G.M. (2011–2012)
 Kwaku Bonsu Osei - Spartak Subotica (2022-present)
 Francis Bossman – Sloboda Užice (2010–2012, 2014–2015), Jagodina (2012–2013)
 Osman Bukari – Red Star (2022–present)
 Joseph Cudjoe – Radnički Kragujevac (2014–2015)
 Haminu Draman – Red Star (2005–2006)
 Abraham Frimpong – Vojvodina (2011)–2012), Napredak Kruševac (2011–2016), Red Star (2016–2018)
 Abdul Rashid Fuseini - TSC Bačka Topola (2022–present)
 Abel Hammond – Metalac G.M. (2010–2011)
 Mohammed-Awal Issah – Red Star (2008–2011)
 Kojo Kankam – Radnički Niš (2012–2013)
 Owusu-Ansah Kontor – Metalac G.M. (2011–2015), Novi Pazar (2015–2016)
 Francis Kyeremeh – Jagodina (2015–2016), Radnik Surdulica (2016–2019)
 Abubakar Moro – Donji Srem (2014–2015)
 Ibrahim Mustapha – Zlatibor Čajetina (2020–2021), Red Star (2021)–2022,2022–2023), Novi Pazar (2021-(2022)
 Abdul Rashid Obuobi – Donji Srem (2014–2016), Voždovac (2020–2021,2021-2022)
 Ferdinand Opoku – Rad Beograd (2011–2012)
 Quincy Osei – Hajduk Kula (2011–2012)
 Godwin Osei Bonsu – Radnički Kragujevac (2014–2015)
 Samuel Owusu – Radnik Surdulica (2014–2016), Čukarički (2017–2019,2022–present)
 Vilson Kwame Owusu – Čukarički (2019–2020)
 Obeng Regan – Napredak Kruševac (2012–2014), Čukarički (2014–2017), Mladost Lučani (2020–2021)
 Rashid Sumaila – Red Star (2018–2019)
 Zakaria Suraka – Radnik Surdulica (2015–2016), Dinamo Vranje (2016–2019), Mladost Lučani (2019–2020)
 Prince Tagoe – Partizan (2010–2011)
 Ibrahim Tanko – Mladost Lučani (2019–2020), Javor Ivanjica (2020–present)
 Michael Tawiah – Borac Čačak (2014–2015)

Greece 
 Theodoros Apostolidis – Bor (1969–1972)
 Nikolaos Baxevanos – Spartak Subotica (2022–2023)
 Diamantis Chouchoumis – Vojvodina (2018–2019)
 Andreas Dermitzakis – Radnik Surdulica (2018–2019)
 Galanos – Obilić (1942–1943)
 Lefteris Matsoukas – Dinamo Vranje (2018–2020)
 Nemanja Milojević – Čukarički (2016–2018), Vojvodina (2018–2019), Voždovac (2020–2022), Kolubara Lazarevac (2022–present)
 Sifnios – Somborski SK (1930)
 Andreas Vlachomitros – Javor Ivanjica (2016–2017)
 Michalis Zistakis – Jedinstvo Beograd (1924–1925), Radnički Beograd (1925–1926)

Guadeloupe 
 Thomas Phibel – Red Star (2016–2017)

Guinea 

 Abdoulaye Cissé – Novi Pazar (2020–2021)
 Sekou Keita – Voždovac (2021–2022)
 Seydouba Soumah – Partizan (2017–2018, 2019–2021)
 Kalla Toure – Sloboda Užice (2012–2013)

Guinea-Bissau 

 Bacar Baldé – Borac Čačak (2016–2017)
 Ednilson – Partizan (2007–2008)
 Almami Moreira – Partizan (2007–2011), Vojvodina (2011–2013)

Honduras 
 Luis Garrido – Red Star (2012–2013)

Hong Kong 
 Dejan Antonić – Spartak Subotica (1989–1990), Napredak Kruševac (1990–1992), Obilić (1994–1995)

Hungary

 Eugen Ábrahám aka Saraz II – Vojvodina (1923–1924)
 János Báki – Radnički Kragujevac (1945–1946)
 Lajos Barna – Bačka Subotica (1939–1940)
 Árpád Blau – BSK Beograd (1920–1921)
 Gyula Blau – Velika Srbija (1913–1914), Juda Makabi (1921–1923)
 Bertalan Bocskay – TSC Bačka Topola (2021–2022)
 Ferenc Bódi – NAK Novi Sad (1937–1942)
 János Borsó – Vojvodina (1985–1986)
 Rajmond Breznik – Juda Makabi (1923–1924), NTK Novi Sad (1924–1925)
 Antun Copko – Bačka Subotica (191_–1923)
 Géza Copko – Bačka Subotica (191_–1925)
 Ladiszlav Csányi – Vojvodina (1967–1969)
 Pál Dárdai – Vojvodina (1985–1986)
 Dezső – Vojvodina (1919–1920)
 Kálmán Dobi – NAK Novi Sad (1924–1925)
 Sándor Dudás – Vojvodina (1921–1926)
 József Dzurják – Spartak Subotica (1990–1991)
 Gyula Ellbogen – BSK Beograd (1923–1924)
 József Fábián – NAK Novi Sad (193x–194x)
 István Gligor – OFK Beograd (1973–1974)
 Árpád Gőgös – NAK Novi Sad (193x–1937)
 Nándor Guttmann – Srpski mač (1908)
 János Hajdú – NAK Novi Sad (1924–1925)
 Nándor Hargitai – NAK Novi Sad (1940–1943)
 Gyula Hegedűs – ŽAK Subotica (1935–1937)
 Filip Holender – Partizan (2020–2022)
 Gyula Horváth – NAK Novi Sad (1924–1925)
 Zoltan Inotai – SAND Subotica (1927–1929)
 Jenő Kalmár – Radnički Beograd (1945–1946)
 János Karába – NAK Novi Sad (1936–1937)
 Zsombor Kerekes – Bečej (1990–1996), Spartak Subotica (1996–1999)
 László Köteles – Železnik (2002–2003)
 Lajos Kovács – NAK Novi Sad (1937–1945)
 Ede Krausz – SAND Subotica (1921–1923)
 Bertalan Kun – Proleter Novi Sad (2021–2022)
 József Lakatos – 14. Oktobar Niš (1946–1947)
 Ferenc Makó – Partizan (195x–195x)
 Béla Mayer – Somborski SK (1923–1924)
 Tamás Nagy – Spartak Subotica (1990–1991)
 Károly Nemes – NAK Novi Sad (1919–1924), Jugoslavija (1924–1925)
 István Nyers – ŽAK Subotica (1941–1945), Spartak Subotica (1945–1946)
 Mario Onhaus – Hajduk Kula (1999–2000)
 Sándor Peics – Vojvodina (1929–1930)
 Ferenc Plattkó – KAFK Kula (1921–1922)
 Zsolt Radics – Spartak Subotica (1998–2001)
 András Rózsa – ŽAK Kikinda (1935–1936)
 József Rumos – NAK Novi Sad (193_–1941)
 József Schaller – KAFK Kula (1924–1925)
 Lajos Schönfeld aka Tusko – NAK Novi Sad (1918–1920), Vojvodina (1921–1922), BSK Beograd (1922–1924)
 Vilmos Sipos – Jugoslavija (1930–1931)
 Gyula Spitz – Partizan (1946–1947)
 Toni Szabó – BSK Beograd (1921–1924)
 Sándor Szluha – Vojvodina (1939–1940), NAK Novi Sad (1940–1942)
 Adrián Szőke - TSC Bačka Topola (2022-present)
 Gusztáv Taupert – Bačka Subotica (1923)
 Janos Thurzó – NAK Novi Sad (193x–1937)
 Tőrők – BSK Beograd (1920–1921)
 Flórián Urbán – Spartak Subotica (1999–2000)
 Sándor Weisz – Juda Makabi (1921–1923), Vojvodina (1923–1927, 1928–1929)

Indonesia 
 Ilija Spasojević – Vojvodina (2002–2005), Borac Čačak (2009–2010)
 Witan Sulaeman – Radnik Surdulica (2019–2021)

Iraq 
 Rebin Sulaka – Radnički Niš (2019–2020)

Israel 

 Bibras Natcho – Partizan (2019–present)
 Idan Vered – Red Star (2015–2016)

Italy
 Giovanni Bertotto – Jedinstvo Beograd (1924–1925)
 Luigi Di Franco – Jedinstvo Beograd (1937–1941), Jugoslavija (1941–1942)
 Diego Falcinelli – Red Star (2020–2021)
 Filippo Falco – Red Star (2020–2022)
 Otmar Gazzari – BSK Beograd (1929–1933)
 Emanuele Lirussi – OFK Beograd (2005–2006)
 Cristiano Piccini – Red Star (2021–2022)
 Rodolfo Tommasi – BSK Beograd (1932–1933)

Jamaica
 Norman Campbell – Čukarički (2021–2022), Javor Ivanjica (2022–present)

Japan 

 Takuma Asano – Partizan (2019–2021)
 Mitsusuke Maruyama – Hajduk Kula (2002–2003)
 Ryohei Michibuchi – Radnički Niš (2021–2023)
 Ryohei Miyazaki – Bačka Bačka Palanka (2020–2021)
 Shingo Morita – Rad Beograd (2003–2004)
 Takuya Murayama – Zemun (2018–2019)
 Ryosuke Nagasawa – Radnički Niš (2021–2022)
 Ryota Noma – Radnički Niš (2016–2020)
 Keisuke Ogawa – Sloboda Užice (2013–2014)
 Shohei Okuno – Sloboda Užice (2013–2014)
 Arihiro Sentoku - Voždovac (2022–2023)
 Noboru Shimura – Spartak Subotica (2017–2019,2020–present)
 Takayuki Suzuki – Red Star (2005–2007)
 Sho Yamamoto – Spartak Subotica (2019–2020)

Kazakhstan 
 Nenad Erić – Radnički Kragujevac (2001–2002), OFK Beograd (2003–2004, 2005–2006), Borac Čačak (2006–2008)
 Maxim Fedin – Spartak Subotica (2014–2016)
 Bauyrzhan Turysbek – Radnički Niš (2014–2015)

Kenya 
 Richard Odada – Red Star (2020–2021), Metalac G.M. (2021–2022)

Korea D.P.R. 

 Hong Yong-jo – Bežanija (2007–2008)
 So Hyon-uk – Zemun (2018–2019)
 Yong Lee-ja – Napredak Kruševac (2009–2010)

Korea Republic 
 Byeon Jae-min – Dinamo Vranje (2018–2019)
 Cho Yong-kyo – Mladost Apatin (2006–2007)
 Ha Sang-hyun – Radnički Obrenovac (2003–2005)
 Hwang Jong-won – Rad Beograd (2016–2018)
 Jang Su-min – Borac Čačak (2016–2017)
 Kim Chi-woo – Partizan (2004–2005)
 Lee San-hyeon – Bežanija (2007–2009)
 Park In-hyeok – Vojvodina (2017–2018)
 Park Ji-soo – Borac Čačak (2016–2017)
 Park Tae-gyu – Bežanija (2007–2010), BSK Borča (2012–2013)
 Son Joon-hyo - Rad Beograd (2017-2018)

Kosovo 
Counting only players that played for Kosovo national team and in clubs within Serbian league system, after 1992, outside province of Kosovo. 
 Halil Asani – Vojvodina (2001–2002)
 Ismet Berisha – Železnik (1997–1998)
 Sead Gorani – Železnik (1998–2001)
 Enes Maliqi – Milicionar Beograd (1997–1998)
 Isa Sadriu – Partizan (1985–1986)
 Nermin Useni – Javor Ivanjica (2001–2003), Radnički Obrenovac (2002–(2003), Radnički Beograd (2003–2005), Hajduk Kula (2005–2006), Mladost Lučani (2006–2008, 2011–2013)

Krajina 
 Zoran Čugalj - Sartid Smederevo (1995-1998)
 Zoran Dragišić - Hajduk Beograd (1999-2000)
 Sergej Tica - Buducnost Valjevo (199x-1997), Milicionar Beograd (1997-1998), Pristina (1998-1999)

Kyrgyzstan 
 Tamirlan Kozubayev – Jagodina (2015–2016)
 Anton Zemlianukhin – Radnički Niš (2014–2016)

Latvia 
 Oļegs Karavajevs – OFK Beograd (1990–1993)
 Jevgēņijs Kazačoks – Bačka Bačka Palanka (2020–2021)
 Anastasijs Mordatenko – Radnički Niš (2016–2017)
 Kaspars Svārups – Bačka Bačka Palanka (2020–2021)

Liberia 
 Seku Conneh – Vojvodina (2018–2019)
Christian Essel – Radnički Kragujevac (2011–2012)
 Omega Roberts – Sloboda Užice (2011–2012), Smederevo (2012–2013), Red Star (2013–2014), Borac Čačak (2014–2015)

Libya 
 Mohamed El Monir – Jagodina (2011–2014), Partizan (2016–2018)
 Mohamed Zubya – Partizan (2012–2013)

Lithuania 
 Justas Lasickas – Zemun (2017–2018), Voždovac (2019–2022)
 Daniel Romanovskij – Zemun (2018–2019)
 Kęstutis Ruzgys – OFK Beograd (1991–1992)

Mali 
 Kalifa Coulibaly - Red Star (2022–2023)
 Fousseni Diabaté - Partizan (2022–present)
 Issa Hare Diawara – Zemun (2015–2018)
 Sambou Sissoko - Čukarički (2022–present)
 Hamidou Traoré - Partizan (2022–present)
 Mamadou Traoré - Vojvodina (2022–present)

Malta 
 Andrei Agius – Zemun (2003–2004)
 Nenad Veselji – OFK Beograd (1988–1994)

Moldova 
 Vitalie Bulat – Novi Pazar (2013)–2014), OFK Beograd (2013–(2014)

Montenegro 
Excluded the players that played before 2006 when Montenegro became independent.  Montenegrin players that were internationals for FR Yugoslavia/Serbia and Montenegro are indicated in italics.

 Bojan Adžić - Spartak Subotica (2021-present)
 Vladan Adžić – OFK Beograd (2012–2014)
 Aldin Adžović – Borac Čačak (2015–2016)
 Srđan Ajković – Rad Beograd (2009–2012, 2017–2019), BSK Borča (2012–2014)
 Ermin Alić – Spartak Subotica (2015–2016)
 Dražen Anđušić – BSK Borča (2010–2014)
 Emir Azemović – Zemun (2018–2019), Kolubara Lazarevac (2022–present)
 Sead Babača – OFK Beograd (2000–2001), Proleter Zrenjanin (2001–2002), Zemun (2005–2007)
 Boban Bajković – Red Star (2003–2004, 2007–2014), Smederevo (2006–(2007)
 Blažo Bakrač – Borac Čačak (2011–2012)
 Miloš Bakrač – OFK Beograd (2010–2012)
 Saša Balić – OFK Beograd (2007–2008)
 Sead Banda – OFK Beograd (2008–2009)
 Zoran Banović – Red Star (2004–2008)
 Jovan Baošić – Jagodina (2015–2016)
 Marko Baša – OFK Beograd (2000–2001, 2002–2005)
 Veljko Batrović – Radnički Niš (2019–2020)
 Dušan Bigović – Rad Beograd (2017–2018)
 Ramazan Bišević – Novi Pazar (2012–2013)
 David Bjelica - Mladost Lučani (2022–2023)
 Dragan Bogavac – Red Star (2001–2005), OFK Beograd (2012–2014)
 Ivan Bojović – Čukarički Stankom (2001–2005, 2007–2008), Voždovac (2006–2007)
 Marko Bojović - Napredak Kruševac (2022-present)
 Dejan Boljević – Smederevo (2011–2012), Novi Pazar (2012–2013), Čukarički (2013–2016), Voždovac (2016–2017)
 Darko Bošković – Mladost Apatin (2004–2008), Spartak Subotica (2008–2011), Bačka Bačka Palanka (2016–2017)
 Ivan Bošković – Vojvodina (2006–2007), Borac Čačak (2007–2008)
 Bojan Božović – Napredak Kruševac (2013–2015), Spartak Subotica (2015–2016)
 Darko Božović – Bežanija (2005–2007), Partizan (2007–2010), Sloboda Užice (2010–2012), Voždovac (2014–2015)
 Mladen Božović – Partizan (2007–2010)
 Vladimir Božović – OFK Beograd (2001–2002, 2003–2007)
 Miloš Brnović – Radnički Kragujevac (2021–present)
 Nenad Brnović – Hajduk Kula (1998–1999), Partizan (2004–2009), Rad Beograd (2008–(2009)
 Marko Bugarin - Spartak Subotica (2022-present)
 Boris Bulajić – Borac Čačak (2015–2016)
 Darko Bulatović – Radnički Niš (2014–2016), Čukarički (2016–2017), Voždovac (2017–2018)
 Radosav Bulić – Sartid Smederevo (1998–2001, 2003–2004), Red Star (2001–2002), Radnički Obrenovac (2002–2003), FK Voždovac (2005–2007)
 Igor Burzanović – Red Star (2006–2009)
 Lazar Carević - Vojvodina (2022–present)
 Stefan Cicmil – Radnički Niš (2012–2013), Spartak Subotica (2013–2014), Mladost Lučani (2014–2015)
 Jovan Čađenović – Zemun (2017)–2018), Borac Čačak (2017–(2018), Metalac G.M. (2021-2022)
 Nikola Čelebić – BSK Borča (2011–2013)
 Marko Ćetković – Partizan (2007–2008)
 Nemanja Ćosović – Donji Srem (2013–2014)
 Mitar Ćuković – Proleter Novi Sad (2017–2019), Napredak Kruševac (2019–2022)
 Dejan Damjanović – Železnik (2000–2003), FK Bežanija (2003–2007), Radnički Beograd (2003–2005)
 Dejan Damjanović – Napredak Kruševac (2009)–2010)
 Slavko Damjanović – Spartak Subotica (2012–2013), TSC Bačka Topola (2019–2021), Novi Pazar (2022-2023)
 Danilo Dašić – Radnički Niš (2019–2020), Zlatibor Čajetina (2020–present)
 Uroš Delić – Rad Beograd (2005–2011, 2013–2014), Metalac G.M. (2015–2016), Borac Čačak (2016–2018)
 Stefan Denković – Vojvodina (2013–2014), Spartak Subotica (2018–2021)
 Andrija Dragojević – OFK Beograd (2012–2013)
 Miloš Dragojević – OFK Beograd (2014–2015)
 Nikola Drinčić – Partizan (2003–2004, 2013–2015), Budućnost Banatski Dvor (2005–2006), Rad Beograd (2016–2017), Čukarički (2017–2018), Radnički Niš (2018–2019), Vojvodina (2019–present)
 Mišo Dubljanić – Spartak Subotica (2018–present)
 Aleksandar Dubljević – Inđija (2010)–2011)
 Miloš Đalac – Novi Pazar (2010–2012)
 Radomir Đalović – Red Star (2000–2001), Železnik (2001–2002)
 Lazar Đokić – Donji Srem (2014–2015), Spartak Subotica (2016–2017), Dinamo Vranje (2016–2017, 2018–present), Čukarički (2017–2018)
 Stefan Đorđević – Vojvodina (2016–2017)
 Uroš Đuranović – Javor Ivanjica (2015)–2016), Radnički Niš (2020–2021), Kolubara Lazarevac (2021–2022, 2022-present)
 Aleksa Đurasović - Spartak Subotica (2022–present)
 Zoran Đurašković – Mladost Lučani (1999–2002), Železnik (2002–2005), Smederevo (2005–2009)
 Uroš Đurđević – Rad Beograd (2011–2014), Partizan (2016–2018)
 Vuk Đurić – Hajduk Kula (2010–2011), Sloboda Užice (2011–2012, 2015–2016)
 Duško Đurišić – OFK Beograd (1993–2000), Vojvodina (2009–2010)
 Ljubomir Đurović – Mladost Lučani (2007–2009)
 Nenad Đurović – Inđija (2009–2011)
 Ivan Fatić – Vojvodina (2013–2014)
 Denis Fetahović – Javor Ivanjica (2005–2007)
 Marko Filipović – Čukarički Stankom (2009–2010, 2011–2012)
 Savo Gazivoda – Radnik Surdulica (2016–2017), Radnički Niš (2017–2018), Rad Beograd (2020–present)
 Vladan Giljen – OFK Beograd (2013–2014)
 Nikola Gluščević – Proleter Novi Sad (2020–present)
 Nemanja Gojačanin – Javor Ivanjica (2013–2015)
 Tigran Goranović – Čukarički (2014–2015)
 Petar Grbić – OFK Beograd (2012–2013), Partizan (2013–2016), Radnički Niš (2018–2019)
 Žarko Grbović – Rad Beograd (2017–2018)
 Bojan Grdinić – BSK Borča (2008–2011)
 Boško Guzina – Rad Beograd (2014–2015, 2016–2018)
 Vladimir Ilić – Javor Ivanjica (2006–2010), Jagodina (2010–2015)
 Mirko Ivanić – Vojvodina (2013–2016), Red Star (2018–present)
 Igor Ivanović – OFK Beograd (2012–2014)
 Branislav Janković – Čukarički (2015–2017)
 Marko Janković – OFK Beograd (2014–2015), Partizan (2016–2019)
 Milan Jelovac - Spartak Subotica (2021-2022)
 Milan Jovanović – Mladost Lučani (2001–2002), Železnik (2002–2003), Red Star (2012–2013)
 Stevan Jovetić – Partizan (2005–2008)
 Vladimir Jovović – Red Star (2015)–2016), OFK Beograd (2015–(2016), Napredak Kruševac (2016)–2017), Spartak Subotica (2016–(2017)
 Asmir Kajević – BSK Borča (2008–2012), Čukarički (2016–2022)
 Miloš Kalezić - Novi Pazar (2021-2022)
 Vasko Kalezić – Vojvodina (2017–2018), Spartak Subotica (2020–present)
 Darko Karadžić – Rad Beograd (2008–2009), Spartak Subotica (2010–2011)
 Nemanja Kartal – Radnički Niš (2016–2017)
 Filip Kasalica – OFK Beograd (2004–2007), Hajduk Kula (2007–2011), Sloboda Užice (2011)–2012), Red Star (2011–2014), Napredak Kruševac (2016–2018), Rad Beograd (2018–2020), Radnički Niš (2020–2022)
 Mladen Kašćelan – OFK Beograd (2004–2006), Voždovac (2006–2007)
 Petar Kasom – Partizan (1998–2000), Budućnost Banatski Dvor (2002–2006), Smederevo (2006–2008)
 Ivan Kecojević – Čukarički Stankom (2009–2010), OFK Beograd (2010–2012)
 Luka Klikovac – Vojvpdina (2014–2015)
 Damir Kojašević – Vojvodina (2017–2018), Radnički Niš (2018–2019)
 Boris Kopitović – Čukarički (2016–2019), Vojvodina (2021–2022), Javor Ivanjica (2022-present)
 Žarko Korać – Vojvodina (2007–2009)
 Marko Kordić – Vojvodina (2011–2013, 2013–2017), Napredak Kruševac (2019–2020)
 Šaleta Kordić – Vojvodina (2011–2012,2015–2016)
 Nebojša Kosović – Vojvodina (2010–2014), Partizan (2015–2019)
 Igor Kostić – Hajduk Kula (2010–2011)
 Danko Kovačević – Čukarički Stankom (2010–2012)
 Ljubomir Kovačević – Zemun (2018–2019), Rad Beograd (2019–present)
 Miloš Kovačević – Hajduk Kula (2008–2013)
 Slaven Kovačević – Zemun (2004–2007)
 Nedjeljko Kovinić – Radnički Kragujevac (2021–2022)
 Ivica Kralj – Partizan (1995–1998, 2000–2001, 2003–2007)
 Miloš Krkotić – Metalac G.M. (2016–2017)
 Nikola Krstović – Red Star (2019–present)
 Alija Krnić – Javor Ivanjica (2017–2020,2021–present)
 Filip Kukuličić – Zemun (2018–2019)
 Dušan Lagator – Čukarički (2015–2018)
 Risto Lakić – Partizan (2007–2008), Vojvodina (2008–2010)
 Blažo Lalević – Hajduk Kula (2004–2005, 2006–2008, 2009–2011)
 Ilija Lalević – Budućnost Banatski Dvor (2005–2006), Banat Zrenjanin (2006–2009, 2011–2013)
 Igor Lambulić – BSK Borča (2011–2012)
 Uroš Leković – BSK Borča (2012–2013)
 Stefan Lončar – Rad Beograd (2016–2017), Novi Pazar (2021–2023)
 Stefan Lukačević – Metalac G.M. (2015–2017)
 Bojan Magud – Zemun (2015–2018)
 Luka Malešević – Radnik Surdulica (2021–2022)
 Staniša Mandić – Čukarički (2013–2017), Metalac G.M. (2021-2022)
 Ivan Maraš – Hajduk Kula (2008–2011)
 Stevan Marković – OFK Beograd (2010–2012)
 Rastko Marsenić – TSC Bačka Topola (2021–2022)
 Vuk Martinović – OFK Beograd (2015–2016)
 Adam Marušić – Voždovac (2010–2014)
 Aleksa Marušić - Mladost GAT (2022–2023)
 Luka Merdović – OFK Beograd (2010–2011), Metalac G.M. (2014–2016), Radnik Surdulica (2016–2017)
 Milan Mešter – Hajduk Kula (2001–2003), Zemun (2003–2004, 2005–2007)
 Stefan Mihajlović – Bačka Bačka Palanka (2018–present)
 Čedomir Mijanović – Zemun (2004–2007)
 Nemanja Mijušković – OFK Beograd (2009–2010)
 Kostadin Mikić – Čukarički (2015–2016)
 Mirko Milikić – Inđija (2020–2021)
 Maksim Milović – Voždovac (2017–2018), Mladost Lučani (2019-present)
 Miloš Milović – Voždovac (2020–present)
 Filip Mitrović – Bačka Bačka Palanka (2020–present)
 Miloš Mrvaljević – OFK Beograd (2006–2009, 2009–(2010), 2010–2012), Hajduk Kula (2008–(2009)
 Marko Mugoša – Borac Čačak (2007–2009, 2011–2014), Red Star (2009–2010), Jagodina (2010–2011), Novi Pazar (2011)–2012)
 Bojica Nikčević – Čukarički (2018–2019), Novi Pazar (2020–present)
 Baćo Nikolić – Borac Čačak (2013–2015)
 Jovan Nikolić – Rad Beograd (2010–2011), Hajduk Kula (2011–2012)
 Nemanja Nikolić – Red Star (2008–2010), Spartak Subotica (2010–2011), OFK Beograd (2011–2013), Voždovac (2016–2020), Kolubara Lazarevac (2021–present)
 Srđan Nikolić – Obilić (2005–2009)
 Stefan Nikolić – OFK Beograd (2007–2008), Radnik Surdulica (2016–2017, 2018–2019), Napredak Kruševac (2017–2018)
 Milko Novaković – Banat Zrenjanin (2007–2008), Vojvodina (2010–2011, 2013–2016), Javor Ivanjica (2011–2013), BSK Borča (2012–(2013)
 Mitar Novaković – Čukarički Stankom (2001–2003), Železnik (2003–2005), Rad Beograd (2005–2006), OFK Beograd (2006–2008, 2013–2014)
 Marko Obradović - Spartak Subotica (2022–2023)
 Dejan Ognjanović – Partizan (2001–2004), FK Obilić (2005–2006), Smederevo (2009–2011, 2012–2013)
 Petar Orlandić – Red Star (2014–2017)
 Nemanja Ostojić – Radnički Niš (2012–2013)
 Petar Pavićević – Vojvodina (2019–present)
 Savo Pavićević – Hajduk Kula (1999–2008), Vojvodina (2007–(2008), Red Star (2013–2016), Spartak Subotica (2016–2017)
 Vojin Pavlović – Inđija (2019–2020)
 Balša Peličić – Donji Srem (2014–2015)
 Mihailo Perović – Voždovac (2017–2018)
 Periša Pešukić – Partizan (2019–2020), Novi Pazar (2020–present)
 Igor Petković – Mladost Apatin (2001–2002), Čukarički Stankom (2007–2008)
 Luka Petričević – Jagodina (2012–2014)
 Rade Petrović – Borac Čačak (2006–2008)
 Igor Poček – Zlatibor Čajetina (2020–2021)
 Dragoslav Poleksić – Hajduk Kula (1995–1996), Radnički Obrenovac (2003–2004), Radnički Beograd (2004–2006), Inđija (2007–2011)
 Balša Popović - Kolubara Lazarevac (2021–present)
 Nikola Popović – Spartak Subotica (2017–2018)
 Milan Purović – Red Star (2005–2007), OFK Beograd (2011–2012), Spartak Subotica (2016–2017), Radnik Surdulica (2017–2018)
 Dejan Račić – Voždovac (2015–2017)
 Miloš Radanović – Budućnost Banatski Dvor/Banat Zrenjanin (2004–2006), Smederevo (2007–2008)
 Vasilije Radenović – BSK Borča (2012–2013, 2016–2017), Proleter Novi Sad (2017–2019)
 Nikola Radojičić – Smederevo (2012–2013)
 Dragoljub Radoman - Mladost GAT (2022–2023)
 Srđan Radonjić – Partizan (2003–2007)
 Aleksandar Radović – BSK Borča (2011–2012)
 Igor Radović – Milicionar Beograd (2000–2001), OFK Beograd (2001–2004), Hajduk Beograd (2004–2005), Hajduk Kula (2005–2006), Vojvodina (2006–2007)
 Ilija Radović – Vojvodina (2007–(2008), Spartak Subotica (2013–2015), Napredak Kruševac (2014–(2015)
 Andrija Radulović - Red Star (2020-2021), Mladost GAT (2022)-2023), Radnik Surdulica (2022-present)
 Danilo Radulović – Borac Čačak (2009–(2010)
 Miloš Radulović – Napredak Kruševac (2014–2015)
 Pavle Radulovic - Voždovac (2020-2022)
 Risto Radunović – Borac Čačak (2014–2015)
 Milivoje Raičević – OFK Beograd (2011–2012)
 Marko Rakonjac – Čukarički (2016-2019,2020–2022), Red Star (2022-present)
 Momčilo Rašo – Radnički Kragujevac (2021–2022)
 Stevan Reljić – Red Star (2009–2011, 2012–2013), Borac Čačak (2011–2012)
 Vladimir Rodić – Rad Beograd (2012–2015, 2016–2017)
 Bojan Roganović – Čukarički (2021–present)
 Anđelo Rudović – Spartak Subotica (2017–2018)
 Niša Saveljić – Hajduk Kula (1993–1994), Partizan (1994–1997, 2000–(2001), 2005–2007)
 Stefan Savić – BSK Borča (2008–2010), Partizan (2010–2011)
 Vladan Savić – Mladost Apatin (2000–2003), Voždovac (2006–2007)
 Vukan Savićević – Red Star (2012–2015)
 Nemanja Sekulić – Vojvodina (2012–2013)
 Radislav Sekulić – Čukarički (2013–2014)
 Marko Simić – Jagodina (2010–2011)
 Đorđije Spahić – Bačka Bačka Palanka (2017–2018)
 Marko Stanovčić – Smederevo (2012–2013)
 Slaven Stjepanović – Partizan (2007–2008), Vojvodina (2008–2010)
 Filip Stojković – Red Star (2011–2012, 2017–2019), Čukarički (2012–2016)
 Aleksandar Šćekić – Partizan (2018–2022)
 Nemanja Ščekić – Čukarički Stankom (2009–2011), Javor Ivanjica (2017–2018), Zemun (2018–2019)
 Nikola Šipčić - Rad Beograd (2016-2020)
 Aleksandar Šofranac – Javor Ivanjica (2013–2015)
 Jovan Tanasijević – Vojvodina (1997–2003), Inđija (2010–2011)
 Luka Tiodorović – Smederevo (2012–2013), Radnički Kragujevac (2014–2015)
 Žarko Tomašević – Partizan (2012–2013)
 Goran Trobok – Partizan (1997–2003), Smederevo (2006–2007)
 Ilija Tučević – Rad Beograd (2020–present)
 Janko Tumbasević – Vojvodina (2007–2011, (2013)–2014, 2014–2015), Spartak Subotica (2013–(2014, 2015–2016, 2022–present), Mladost Lučani (2016–2019,2021-2022), TSC Bačka Topola (2019–2021)
 Uroš Vemić – Zemun (2006–2007), Jagodina (2008–2009)
 Marko Vešović – Red Star (2010–2014)
 Stefan Vico – Rad Beograd (2012–2015, 2016–2019), Javor Ivanjica (2020–2023)
 Marko Vidović – Spartak Subotica (2013–2014), Bačka Bačka Palanka (2016–2017),  Rad Beograd (2017–2018)
 Nedeljko Vlahović – Radnik Surdulica (2016–2017)
 Nemanja Vlahović – OFK Beograd (2015–2016)
 Bojan Vlaović – Metalac G.M. (2019–present)
 Vladimir Volkov – Radnički Beograd (2004–2005), OFK Beograd (2008–2009), Partizan (2011–2015), Radnički Niš (2016–2017), Rad Beograd (2017–2019)
 Filip Vorotović – Borac Čačak (2017)–2018), Spartak Subotica (2017–(2018)
 Marko Vučić - Novi Pazar (2022-2023)
 Jovan Vučinić – Smederevo (2011–2012), Jagodina (2013–2014)
 Igor Vujačić – Vojvodina (2012–2014), Partizan (2019–present)
 Vule Vujačić – Rad Beograd (2017–2018)
 Nikola Vujadinović – Javor Ivanjica (2011–2012), Radnički Niš (2021–2022), Čukarički (2022)-2023), Mladost GAT (2022-present)
 Luka Vujanović – Vojvodina (2017–2018)
 Nikša Vujanović – Spartak Subotica (2019–2021), Voždovac (2022–present)
 Nikola Vujnović – Rad Beograd (2014–2015), Voždovac (2020–2022,2022–present)
 Miladin Vujošević – Jagodina  (2014–2015)
 Branko Vujović – Javor Ivanjica (2008–2009), Metalac G.M. (2009–2010)
 Goran Vujović – Banat Zrenjanin (2006–2008)
 Nikola Vujović – Partizan (2008–2009)
 Predrag Vujović – Napredak Kruševac (2001–2005, 2007–2010), FK Vojvodina (2006)–2007), Borac Čačak (2006–(2007)
 Marko Vukasović – Vojvodina (2016–2018)
 Mladen Vukasović – Radnik Surdulica (2016–2017)
 Andrija Vukčević – Spartak Subotica (2017–2019)
 Ivan Vukčević – Vojvodina (2021–present)
 Marko Vukčević – Vojvodina (2015–2016)
 Simon Vukčević – Partizan (2002–2006), Vojvodina (2013–2014)
 Rade Vukotić – OFK Beograd (2001–2002, 2003–2005), Borac Čačak (2005–2006), Bežanija (2007–2008)
 Ivan Vuković – OFK Beograd (2014–2015)
 Novak Vuković – Voždovac (2018–present)
 Milan Vušurović – Napredak Kruševac (2019–2020)
 Dejan Zarubica – OFK Beograd (2013–2015)
 Miloš Zečević - Kolubara Lazarevac (2021–2022)
 Bojan Zogović – Metalac G.M. (2014–2016, 2017–(2018), Novi Pazar (2016)–2017), Radnički Niš (2016–2017), Rad Beograd (2017)–2018), Bačka Bačka Palanka (2018–2019)
 Stefan Zogović – Vojvodina (2009–2010), Donji Srem (2013–2014)
 Igor Zonjić – Mladost Lučani (2013–2015), Rad Beograd (2017–2018)
 Darko Zorić – Borac Čačak (2015–2016), Čukarički (2016–2019)
 Nikola Zvrko – Mladost Lučani (2016–2018), Bačka Bačka Palanka (2017–(2018)
 Gojko Žižić – Čukarički Stankom (2010–2011), Metalac G.M. (2011–2012)

Montenegrin internationals that only played in Serbian top league clubs before Montenegrin independence.
 Radoslav Batak – Vojvodina (1997–1998, 1999–2003)
 Branko Bošković – Red Star (1998–2004)
 Bojan Brnović – Partizan (2003–2005), Obilić (2004–(2005)
 Đorđije Ćetković – Čukarički Stankom (2002–2003), Železnik/Voždovac (2003–2006)
 Andrija Delibašić – Partizan (1999–2004)
 Miodrag Džudović – OFK Beograd (2002–2004)
 Vladimir Gluščević – Borac Čačak (2004–2005), Rad Beograd (2005–2006)
 Milorad Peković – OFK Beograd (1994–1999, 2001–2002), Partizan (1999–2001)
 Mirko Raičević – Obilić (2002–2003)

Namibia 
 Rudolf Bester – Čukarički Stankom (2007–2009)
 Eliphas Shivute – Čukarički Stankom (2001–2002)
 Hendrik Somaeb – Zemun (2018–2019)

Netherlands 
 Lorenzo Ebecilio – Red Star (2018–2019)
 Serginho Greene – Vojvodina (2012–2013)
 Aleksandar Janković – Radnički Kragujevac (2014–2015)
 Rajiv van La Parra – Red Star (2019–2020)
 Queensy Menig – Partizan (2021–present)
 Mink Peeters – Čukarički (2019–2020)

New Zealand 
 Adam Mitchell – Red Star (2016)–2017)

Nigeria 

 Abiodun Dayo Adeyoriju – Borac Čačak (2009–2010)
 Uche Agbo – Rad Beograd (199_–199_), Obilić (1995–1997)
 Victor Agbo – Jagodina (2010–2011)
 Anthony Agha Ibiam – Javor Ivanjica (2008–2009)
 Donald Agu – Obilić (1994–1995)
 Nnaemeka Ajuru – Javor Ivanjica (2004–2005, 2006–2009, 2014–2016), Vojvodina (2009–2013), Spartak Subotica (2016–2017)
 Uche Akubuike – Hajduk Kula (200_–200_)
 Victor Amos – Mladost Lučani (2018–2020)
 Kevin Amuneke – Sloboda Užice (2013–2014)
 Franklin Ayodele – Mladi Radnik (2009–2010)
 Geoffrey Chinedu - Radnički Kragujevac (2022-present)
 Michael Jaja Dagogo – Novi Pazar (2015–2016)
 Abiola Dauda – Red Star (2012–2014)
 Eddy Dombraye – OFK Beograd (2002–2003)
 John Okoye Ebuka – Novi Pazar (2015–2016)
 Okosi Edhere – Bačka Bačka Palanka (2017–2018)
 Frank Egharevba – Javor Ivanjica (2009–2010)
 Ifeanyi Emeghara – Partizan (2004–2006)
 Patrick Friday Eze – Rad Beograd (2013)–2014), Napredak Kruševac (2013–(2014), Mladost Lučani (2014–2015)
 Ikechukwu Ezeh – Napredak Kruševac (2009–2010)
 Bassey Howells – Spartak Subotica (2018–2019)
 Timothy Idogbe – Napredak Kruševac (2009–2010)
 Ifeanyi Igbodo – Javor Ivanjica (2002–2004, 2007–2008)
 Victor Jideonwor – Javor Ivanjica (2005–2008)
 Moses John – Zemun (2018–2019)
 Adekunle Lukmon – Borac Čačak (2004–2005)
 Oladipupo Martins – Partizan (2002–2003)
 Samuel Nnamani – Jagodina (2014–2015)
 Obiora Odita – Javor Ivanjica (2003–2005, (2006)–2007, (2010)–2011, 2011–2012,2021–2022), Partizan (2005–2007), Voždovac (2014–2016), Mladost Lučani (2016–2021)
 Ugochukwu Oduenyi - Javor Ivanjica (2021–2023)
 Hypolite Emeka Oguegbu – Javor Ivanjica (2010–2011)
 Obele Okeke Onyebuchi – Javor Ivanjica (2002–2003)
 Eze Okeuhie – Vojvodina (2017–2019), Čukarički (2019–2021)
 Samuel Okon – Dinamo Vranje (2018–2019)
 Solomon Oladele – Jagodina (2008–2009)
 Daniel Olerum – Sloboda Užice (2012–2013)
 Emmanuel Oletu – Spartak Subotica (2008–2010)
 Peter Omoduemuke – Obilić (2004–2007)
 Ifeanyi Onyilo – Javor Ivanjica (2009–2013), Red Star (2013–2014)
 Umar Sadiq – Partizan (2019–2021)
 Gbolahan Salami – Red Star (2014–2015)
 Okomayin Segun Onimisi – Dinamo Vranje (2016–2020)
 Jesse Sekidika – Napredak Kruševac (2015–2018)
 Theophilus Solomon – Partizan (2017–2018)
 Obinna Tochukwu – Javor Ivanjica (2015–2016)
 Ugo Ukah – Čukarički (2014–2015)
 Eke Uzoma – Spartak Subotica (2015–2016)
 Taribo West – Partizan (2002–2004)
 Abdul Zubairu - Kolubara Lazarevac (2022-present)

North Macedonia 
Named F.Y.R. Macedonia until 2019. Excluded the players that played before 1992 when Macedonia became independent.

 Emil Abaz – Spartak Subotica (2016–2018)
 Ivan Aleksovski – Spartak Subotica (2020–2021)
 Fikret Alomerović – Radnički Niš (199_–199_)
 Aleksa Amanović – Javor Ivanjica (2015–2020)
 Stefan Andrić – Radnički Kragujevac (2014–2016)
 Stefan Aškovski – Partizan (2012–2013), Donji Srem (2013)–2014), Napredak Kruševac (2013–(2014), Novi Pazar (2015–2016)
 Daniel Avramovski – Red Star (2014–2015, 2016–2017), OFK Beograd (2015–2016), Vojvodina (2017–2018)
 David Babunski – Red Star (2015–2017)
 Aleksandar Bajevski – OFK Beograd (2002–2003), Radnički Niš (2012–2013)
 Goran Bogdanović – Rad Beograd (2012–2013)
 Nikola Bogdanovski – Radnik Surdulica (2019–2022), Novi Pazar (2019-2020, 2022–present)
 Ivica Cvetanovski – Sloboda Užice (1989–1993, 1993–1996), Napredak Kruševac (1993–1994)
 Dragan Čadikovski – Partizan (2007–2009), Radnički Kragujevac (2013–2014)
 Igor Damjanoski – Zvezdara (2001–2002)
 Zoran Danoski – Radnik Surdulica (2018–2021, 2022–present), Proleter Novi Sad (2021)–2022), Mladost Lučani (2021–2022), Novi Pazar (2022)-2023)
 Olivio Dautovski – Napredak Kruševac (1995–1996)
 Benjamin Demir – Spartak Subotica (2018–2019)
 Erol Demir – Železnik (1997–1998)
 Filip Despotovski – OFK Beograd (2002–2004)
 Milan Dimoski – Jastrebac Niš (1991–1994)
 Aleksandar Donev – Bežanija (2006–2007)
 Hristijan Dragarski – Radnik Surdulica (2015–2016)
 Sasho Dukov – OFK Beograd (2012–2013)
 Mario Đurovski – Bežanija (2004–2007), Vojvodina (2007–2011)
 Haris Fakić – OFK Beograd (2002–2005)
 Antonio Filevski – Železnik (1998–2000), Obilić 2000–(2001)
 Jane Gavalovski – Rad Beograd (1998–2004), Obilić (2004)–2005)
 Boban Georgiev – Radnik Surdulica (2019–2020)
 Panče Georgievski – Čukarički Stankom (1999–2000)
 Blaže Georgioski – Sartid Smederevo (1998–1999), Red Star (1999–2001)
 Marjan Gerasimovski – Partizan (1998–2001)
 Bojan Gjorgievski – Mačva Šabac (2017–2018)
 Marko Gjorgjievski – Voždovac (2019–2020)
 Fahrudin Gjurgjević – Spartak Subotica (2011–2013)
 Nikola Gligorov – Bežanija (2006–2007)
 Boban Grnčarov – OFK Beograd (2000–2003)
 Vlatko Grozdanoski – Vojvodina (2007–2010)
 Vasil Gunev – Napredak Kruševac (1988–1990, 1991–1993)
 Destan Haciya – Borac Čačak (2017–2018)
 Gjorgji Hristov – Partizan (1994–1997)
 Martin Hristov – Donji Srem (2014–2015)
 Saša Ilić – Partizan (1993–1995)
 Harun Isa – Rad Beograd (1989–1991), Priština (1991–1993)
 Ismail Ismaili – Priština (199_–199_)
 Filip Ivanovski – Javor Ivanjica (2017–2018)
 Nikola Jakimovski – Javor Ivanjica (2011–2013), FK Jagodina (2013–2015)
 Mirsad Jonuz – Rad Beograd (1988)–1989, 1992–1993)
 Aleksa Jordanov – Napredak Kruševac (2020–2021)
 Nikola Karčev – Metalac G.M. (2011)–2012)
 Hristijan Kirovski – OFK Beograd (2002–2006)
 Tome Kitanovski – Voźdovac (2014–2015), Mladost Lučani (2015–2017)
 Stojancho Kostov – Rad Beograd (2020–2021)
 Darko Krsteski – Red Star (1997–1999), Borac Čačak (2004–2007)
 Strahinja Krstevski – Vojvodina (2016–2017), Proleter Novi Sad (2016–2019)
 Petar Krstić – Radnički Niš (2015–2019)
 Blagoja Kuleski – Radnički Niš (1989–1993)
 Stevica Kuzmanovski – Partizan (1982–1983), OFK Beograd (1984–1986, 1990–1991), Rad Beograd (1987–1990, 1997–2000)
 Dimitrija Lazarevski – Zemun (2005–2006)
 Goran Lazarevski – Vojvodina (2002–2003), Radnički Obrenovac (2003–2004)
 Nenad Lazarevski – Borac Čačak (2007–2008), OFK Beograd (2009–2010), Inđija (2012–2014)
 Vlade Lazarevski – Napredak Kruševac (2001–2006), Smederevo (2012–2013), Radnički Niš (2014–2015)
 Aleksandar Lazevski – Partizan (2007–2008, 2010–2013), Rad Beograd (2013–2014), Mladost Lučani (2015–2016)
 Florijan Maksimovski – Hajduk Kula (1997–2000)
 Borče Manevski – Banat Zrenjanin (2008–2010)
 Žan Manovski – Rad Beograd (2010–2011)
 Viktor Markov – Spartak Subotica (2020–2021)
 Marjan Markoski – Hajduk Kula (1997–2000)
 Bojan Markovski – Bežanija (2006–(2007), OFK Beograd (2006–2009)
 Darko Micevski – Sloboda Užice (2009–2011), OFK Beograd (2013–2015), Novi Pazar (2015–2017)
 Gorazd Mihailov – Čukarički Stankom (1998–1999)
 Ljubodrag Milošević – Radnički Niš (1992–1994)
 Sašo Miloševski – Vojvodina (1995–1998)
 Bojan Miovski – Zemun (2018–2019)
 Martin Mirchevski - TSC Backa Topola (2021–present)
 Risto Mitrevski – Donji Srem (2014–2015)
 Daniel Mojsov – Vojvodina (2010–2013)
 Gjorgji Mojsov – Metalac G.M. (2011)–2012)
 Ilija Najdoski – Red Star (1988–1993)
 Ivan Nastevski – Novi Pazar (2015–2016)
 Pavel Nedelkovski – Radnički Niš (2002–2003)
 Matej Nikolov – Zlatibor Čajetina (2020–2021)
 Boban Nikolovski – Obilić (1996–1997), OFK Beograd (1998–1999), Železnik (2000–2002)
 Dragoljub Nikolovski – OFK Beograd (1998–1999)
 Vlada Novevski – Vojvodina (2020-2022), Voždovac (2022–present)
 Tome Pačovski – Železnik (2003–(2004)
 Borjan Panchevski – Dinamo Vranje (2018–2019)
 Angelko Panov – OFK Beograd (2002–2003)
 Filip Petrov – Javor Ivanjica (2009–2011)
 Milovan Petrovikj – Radnik Surdulica (2021–2022)
 Goran Popov – Red Star (2004–2005)
 Emran Ramadani – Hajduk Kula (2010–2011)
 Predrag Ranđelović – Jagodina (2013–2014)
 Filip Ristovski – Javor Ivanjica (2016–2018)
 Dušan Savić – Zemun (2017–2019)
 Žanko Savov – Radnički Niš (199_–199_)
 Mirko Simjanovski – Donji Srem (2014–2015)
 Stefan Spirovski – Borac Čačak (2009–2014)
 Roberto Stajev – Radnički Niš (2015–2016)
 Perica Stančeski – Partizan (2002–2006), Bežanija (2006–2008), Čukarički Stankom (2008–2009), BSK Borča (2012–2013), Rad Beograd (2013–2015)
 Goran Stanić – Rad Beograd (2002–2003)
 Vujadin Stanojković – Partizan (1989–1993)
 Ostoja Stjepanović – Partizan (2005–2006), Čukarički Stankom (2007–2009), OFK Beograd (2015–2016), Rad Beograd (2019–2020)

 Nikola Stojanović – Radnik Surdulica (2008–2009, 2010–2016)
 Milan Stojanovski – Proleter Zrenjanin (1993–1997), Partizan (1997–2000, 2001–2004), Banat Zrenjanin (2008–2009)
 Aco Stojkov – Partizan (2006–2007)
 Dragan Stojkov – Napredak Kruševac (2009–2010), Jagodina (2010–2014)
 Mitko Stojkovski – Red Star (1991–1995)
 Gjorgji Tanušev – Sloboda Užice (2010–2011), BSK Borča (2011–2012)
 Andrej Todoroski – Spartak Subotica (2021–present)
 Todor Todoroski – Radnički Niš (2021–2022)
 Zoran Todorov – Smederevo (2009–2012)
 Aleksandar Todorovski – Radnički Beograd (2002–2005), Rad Beograd (2008–2011), Radnički Niš (2018–2020)
 Zlatko Todorovski – OFK Beograd (1999–2000)
 Borislav Tomovski – Vojvodina (1990–1995)
 Miloš Tošeski – Zemun (2018–2020), Spartak Subotica (2021–present)
 Nikola Tošeski – Proleter Novi Sad (2017–2019)
 Viktor Trenevski – Partizan (1995–1998)
 Ivan Tričkovski – Red Star (2007–2009)
 Daniel Zanovski – Spartak Subotica (2020–2021)

Macedonian internationals that played in Serbian top league clubs only during Yugoslav period:
 Boško Đurovski – Red Star (1978–1989)
 Milko Đurovski – Red Star (1980–1986), Partizan (1986–1990)
 Dejvi Glavevski – Rad Beograd (1990–1992)
 Dragan Kanatlarovski – Red Star (1989–1990)
 Blagoja Milevski – Red Star (1990–1991)
 Darko Pančev – Red Star (1988–1992)

Norway
 Moussa Njie – Partizan (2018–2019)
 Ohi Omoijuanfo – Red Star (2021–2022)

Palestine 
 Javier Cohene – Borac Čačak (2014–2015)

Peru 
 Miguel Araujo – Red Star (2013–2014)

Philippines 
 Diego Bardanca – Inđija (2019–2020)

Poland 

 Grzegorz Bronowicki – Red Star (2007–2009)
 Jeremiah Dąbrowski – Mladost Lučani (2014–2015)
 Tomasz Rząsa – Partizan (2003–2004)

Portugal 

 Andrezinho – Spartak Subotica (2019–2020)
 João Lucas – Red Star (2007–2008)
 Marcelo Santiago – Jagodina (2012–2013)
 Tomané – Red Star (2019–2020)
 Hugo Vieira – Red Star (2015–2017)

Romania 

 Barna Antal – TSC Bačka Topola (2019–2020)
 Radu Banc – Proleter Zrenjanin (1971–1974)
 Miodrag Belodedici – Red Star (1989–1992)
 Ioan Răzvan Chiriţă – Radnički Kragujevac (2000–2002)
 Gabriel Enache – Partizan (2018–2019)
 Aurel Han – Spartak Subotica (1991–1992)
 Jozef Kezdi – Jedinstvo Beograd (1937–1938)
 Gabi Kovács – Juda Makabi (1929–1930)
 Dezideriu Laki – BSK Beograd (1924–1925)
 Teodor Mogin – Vojvodina (1924–1925)
 Cristian Muscalu – Borac Čačak (2010–2011), Voždovac (2013–2014)
 Constantin Nica – Vojvodina (2019–2020)
 Marinel Pascu – OFK Beograd (2001–2002)
 Vasile Păunescu – 14. Oktobar Niš (1946–1947)
 Branimir Pavlov – OFK Kikinda (1992–1993)
 Iulian Popan – Juda Makabi (1923–1924)
 Virgil Popescu – Vojvodina (1938–1941), Partizan (1946–1948)
 Svetozar Popovici – BSK Beograd (1920–1925)
 Iosif Rotariu – OFK Kikinda (1995–1996)
 Marius Sasu – Vojvodina (1997–1998)
 Alin Stoica – Vojvodina (2009–2010)
 Sorin Vlaicu – Red Star (1992–1993) 
 Rudolf Wetzer – BSK Beograd (1924–1925)

Russia 
Including the Soviet Union.

 Leonid Bayer – BASK Beograd (1940–1942)
 Georgiy Bratukhin – Voždovac (2019–2021)
 Daniil Chalov – Inđija (2020–2021)
 Tamirlan Dzhamalutdinov – Novi Pazar (2021–2022)
 Asteri Filaktov – OFK Beograd (1963–1964)
 Ramazan Isayev – Radnički Niš (2016–2017)
 Ivan Konovalov – Radnički Niš (2015–2016), Bačka Bačka Palanka (2016–2017)
 Uchuk Kuldinov – Jedinstvo Beograd (193_–1933), Jugoslavija (1933–1937)
 Martvey Martinkevich - Vojvodina (2020–2021)
 Maksim Martusevich – Javor Ivanjica (2015–2016)
 Ladislav Polikan – NAK Novi Sad (1924–1925)
 Yegor Prutsev – Red Star (2022–present)
 Anton Pushin – Jugoslavija (1936–1937)
 Semen Sheptitskiy – Rad Beograd (2017–2019)
 Georgiy Shishlov – Mačva Šabac (1924–1925)
 Nikolay Simeonov – Vojvodina (1923–1924)
 Andrey Sorokin – Spartak Subotica (2020–2021)
 Vsevolod Stashevskiy – BSK Beograd (1924–1925)
 Sergey Vitvinskiy – Vojvodina (1922–1924)
 Vladislav Yefimov – Sartid Smederevo (1999–2001)

Senegal

 Bado (Badara Badji) – Mladost Lučani (2017–2018)
 Yves Baraye - Vojvodina (2022–present)
 Lamine Diarra – Partizan (2007–2010, 2011–2012)
 Cheikhou Dieng – Spartak Subotica (2017–2018)
 Ibrahima Gueye – Red Star (2006–2009), Radnički Niš (2013–2014)
 Mamadou Mbodj – Napredak Kruševac (2014)–2015), Red Star (2014–2016)
 Ibrahima Mame N'Diaye – Napredak Kruševac (2012–2017, 2017–2019), Čukarički (2019–2021, 2021–present)
 Seydou Bocar Seck – Dinamo Vranje (2018–2020)
 Thierno Thioub - Novi Pazar (2021-2022)

Sierra Leone 

 Mustapha Bangura – Borac Čačak (2015–2016)
 Kelfala Marah – Čukarički Stankom (2003–2005)
 Medo (Mohamed Kamara) – Partizan (2010–2013)
 Lamin Suma – Jagodina (2011–2012)

Singapore 
 Aleksandar Đurić – Napredak Kruševac (2000–2001)

Slovakia 
 Janoš Buzgo – NAK Novi Sad (1935–1936)
 Jozef Buzgo – NAK Novi Sad (1935–1936)
 Hesko – Vojvodina (1923–1924)
 Erik Jirka – Red Star (2018–2019), Radnički Niš (2019–2020)
 Maroš Klimpl – Sloboda Užice (2010–2011)
 Ján Podhradský – Vojvodina (1935–1936), BSK Beograd (1936–1939)
 Nikolas Špalek - TSC Bačka Topola (2022–2023)
 Lajoš Žiga – BASK Beograd (1936–1937)
 Milan Zvarík – Vojvodina (1985–1986)

Slovenia 

Excluded the players that played before 1991 when Slovenia became independent.
 Milenko Ačimovič – Red Star (1997–2002)
 Gregor Balažic – Partizan (2014–2017)
 Klemen Bolha - Napredak Kruševac (2022–present)
 Saša Bosilj – Železnik (2001–2002)
 Marko Božič – Rad Beograd (2007–2008)
 Emir Dautović – OFK Beograd (2014–2015, 2015–2016)
 Timotej Dodlek – Bačka Bačka Palanka (2017–2018)
 Dejan Djermanović – Voždovac (2014–2015)
 Željko Filipović – Vojvodina (2019–2020)
 Branko Ilić – Partizan (2014–2015)
 Safet Jahič – Partizan (2006–2007)
 Dragan Jelić – Radnički Niš (2013–2014)
 Haris Kadrič - Kolubara Lazarevac (2022)-2023), Voždovac (2022–present)
 Darko Karapetrovič – Radnički Niš (1998–1999), Obilić (1998–1999)
 Dejan Kelhar – Red Star (2013–2014)
 David Kiselak – Smederevo (2011–2012)
 Omar Kočar – Mačva Šabac (2020–2021)
 Aljaž Krefl – Spartak Subotica (2016–2017)
 Anej Lovrečič – Voždovac (2014–2015)
 Vladimir Mandić – Vojvodina (2005–2006)
 Danijel Marčeta – Partizan (2008–2009)
 Darko Milanič – Partizan (1986–1987, 1988–1993)
 Džoni Novak – Partizan (1990–1992)
 Vanja Panić – Mačva Šabac (2020–2021)
 Nejc Pečnik – Red Star (2013–2015)
 David Poljanec – Radnički Kragujevac (2014–2015) 
 Milan Rakič – Smederevo (2009–2010)
 Aleksander Rodić – Proleter Zrenjanin (1999–2000), Red Star (2000–2001)
 Filip Starič – Vojvodina (2018–2019)
 Ante Šimundža – Železnik (2001–2002)
 Mirnes Šišić – Red Star (2008–2009)
 Davor Škerjanc – Voždovac (2014–2015)
 Zlatko Zahovič – Partizan (1989–1990, 1991–1993), Proleter Zrenjanin (1990–1991)
 Sandro Zukić – Mačva Šabac (2020–2021)

Slovenian internationals that played in Serbian top league clubs during Yugoslav period:
 Marko Elsner – Red Star (1983–1987)
 Srečko Katanec – Partizan (1986–1988)
 Marko Simeunovič – Red Star (1989–1990), Napredak Kruševac (1990–1991)

South Africa 
 Bernard Parker – Red Star (2008–2009)

South Sudan 
 Kur Kur - Novi Pazar (2022–2023)

Spain 

 José Cañas – Red Star (2019–2020)
 Francis Durán – Jagodina (2012–2013)
 Antonio Moreno – Partizan (2008–2009)
 Marc Valiente – Partizan (2018–2019)

Suriname

 Mitchell Donald – Red Star (2015–2018)

Sweden 

 Bojan Djordjic – Red Star (2003–2004)
 Frederick Enaholo – Vojvodina (1991–1992)
 Marko Mitrović – Radnički Niš (2018)–2019, 2019–2020), Dinamo Vranje (2018–(2019)
 Niclas Nyhlén – Vojvodina (1984–1985)
 Petar Petrović – Radnički Niš (2014–2015, 2018–2019)
 Andrej Simeunović – Voždovac (2017–2018)

Switzerland 
 Miloš Antić – OFK Beograd (2014–2016)
 Milan Basrak – Metalac G.M. (2014–2016), Napredak Kruševac (2017–2018)
 Mihailo Bogićević – Spartak Subotica (2021–present)
 Boško Borenović – Zemun (2006–2007)
 Nemanja Cvijanović – Dinamo Vranje (2018–2020)
 Stefan Čolović – OFK Beograd (2014–2016)
 Filip Frei - Radnički Niš (2022–present)
 Veselin Lakić – Rad Beograd (2016–2017)
 Boban Maksimović – Red Star (2008)–2009), Vojvodina (2008–2010)
 Srdjan Maksimović – Rad Beograd (2005–2007)
 Milan Marjanović – Metalac G.M. (2019–2020)
 Nikola Nikolić – BSK Borča (2009–2010)
 Aleksandar Njeguš – Zlatibor Čajetina (2018–2021)
 Luka Stević – Metalac G.M. (2021–2022)
 Dejan Subotić – Rad Beograd (2018–2019)
 Nikola Sukacev – Metalac G.M. (2020–2021)
 Stefan Todorović – Javor Ivanjica (2010–2011)

Tajikistan 
 Nuriddin Davronov – Sloboda Užice (2012–2013)

Tanzania 
 Morice Abraham – Spartak Subotica (2021–present)
 Alphonce Msanga - Spartak Subotica (2021–present)

Togo 
 Emmanuel Hackman - Mladost GAT (2022-present)

Tunisia 
 Kamel Zaiem – Partizan (2008–2009)

Turkey 
 Ömer Koca – Čukarički Stankom (2000–2002)
 Günkut Özer – Radnički Niš (2015–2016)

Uganda 
 Khalid Aucho – Red Star (2017–2018)
 Nestroy Kizito – Vojvodina (2004–2010), Partizan (2010–2011)
 Eugene Sseppuya – Vojvodina (2007–2008), Čukarički Stankom (2008–2009), Mladi Radnik (2009)–2010), Borac Čačak (2011–2012)

Ukraine 
 Maksym Andrushchenko – Spartak Subotica (2020–2021)
 Taras Bondarenko – Metalac G.M. (2016–2018), Radnički Niš (2018–2020), Radnik Surdulica (2022-present)
 Pavlo Bovtunenko – Novi Pazar (2013–2014)
 Marko Dević – Zvezdara (2000–2002), Železnik (2002–2003), Voždovac (2004–2005, 2019–2020)
 Yevhen Kovalenko – Rad Beograd (2019–2020)
 Serhiy Kulynych – Spartak Subotica (2018–2019)
 Yevhen Pavlov – Mladost Lučani (2014–2015), Radnik Surdulica (2019–2021), Radnički Niš (2021–2022)
 Ivan Spotar – OFK Beograd (1957–1958)
 Mykhailo Stelmakh – Spartak Subotica (1991–1992)
 Vitaliy Tolmachyov – Spartak Subotica (1993–1994)
 Yuriy Vakulko – Partizan (2018–2019)
 Vadym Zhuk – Spartak Subotica (2016–2017)

United States 

 Freddy Adu – Jagodina (2014–2015)
 Danny Barrera – Spartak Subotica (2011–2012)
 Mark Conrad – Vojvodina (2007–2008)
 Matt Dunn – OFK Beograd (2011–2013)
 Romain Gall - Mladost GAT (2022-present)
 Jordan Gruber – OFK Beograd (2005–2006)
 Will John – Čukarički Stankom (2008–2009)
 Ilija Mitić – Partizan (1960–1963), OFK Beograd (1965–1967)
 Simon Mrsic – Bačka Bačka Palanka (2016–2018)
 Preki – Red Star (1982–1985)
 Danilo Radjen – Bačka Bačka Palanka (2020–2021)
 Scoop Stanisic – Partizan (1983–1984)
 Aleksandar Thomas Višić – Rad Beograd (2011–2012)
 Jeremiah White – OFK Beograd (2003–2004)

Uruguay 
 Miguel Angel Lavié – Javor Ivanjica (2009–2010)
 Gerardo Vonder Pütten – Javor Ivanjica (2009–2010)

Uzbekistan 
 Husniddin Gafurov – Javor Ivanjica (2013–2017), Mladost Lučani (2017–2018)
 Murod Rajabov – Novi Pazar (2016–2017)

Zambia 
 Kings Kangwa – Red Star Belgrade (2022–present)

Zimbabwe 
 Blessing Makunike – Javor Ivanjica (2002–2003)
 Mike Temwanjera – Javor Ivanjica (2003–2006), Borac Čačak (2006–2007)
 Leonard Tsipa – Javor Ivanjica (2002–2003)

Doubts
See talk-page.

Other levels

This is a list of foreign players that have played, or play, in the Serbian First League and its predecessors, Second League of Serbia and Montenegro, Yugoslav Second League, top Subassociation Leagues.

The criterium is the same as applied in the main list above.

Abkhazia
 Daur Chanba – Teleoptik (2018–2019), Bačka Bačka Palanka (2019–2020)
 Shabat Logua – Bačka Bačka Palanka (2019–2020), Zlatibor Čajetina (2020–2021)

Albania

 Shpend Abrashi – Trepča (1982–1984)
 Ajazaj – Liria Prizren (1988–1990)
 Bekim Behrami – Priština (1990–1991)
 Mehmet Dragusha – Priština (1994–1998)
 Besnik Hasi – Liria Prizren (1988–1990)
 Almedin Murati – BSK Borča (2013–2014)
 Dodë Tahiri – ASK Obilić Aranđelovac (1930s&1950s)
 Alban Tusuni – Dinamo Vranje (2019–present)

Algeria 
 Adel Beggah - Radnički Beograd (2022–2023)

Argentina 
 Franco Abrego - Rad Beograd (2022-present)
 Guido Barreyro – RFK Novi Sad (2009–2010)
 Luis Ibáñez – Grafičar Beograd (2021–present)
 Leonardo Iorlano – Radnički Niš (2005–2006)
 Gustavo Marino – Radnički Niš (2005–2006)

Armenia 
Artem Karapetyan – Bežanija (2017–2018)

Australia 

Vid Amidzic – Bežanija (2011–2012)
Tomislav Arčaba – OFK Beograd (2015–2017)
John Belme – RFK Novi Sad (2010–2011)
Steven Bozinovski – Radnički Niš (2002–2003)
Matthew Byrne – Donji Srem (2011–2012), Teleoptik (2012–2013)
Enzo Campana - Zlatibor Čajetina (2022–present)
Stephen Frantzeskakis – Sinđelić Beograd (2018–2019)
Zoran Ilic – Jagodina (1993–1995)
Milan Ivanović – Radnički Niš (1986–1988)
Aleksandar Jovanovic – RFK Novi Sad (2009–2011)
Aleksandar Jovovic – BASK Beograd (2010–2011)
Vladimir Kosovac – OFK Beograd (2016–2017)
Sebastian Petrovich – Mačva Šabac (2003–2004)
Salvatore Russo – Bežanija (2017)–2018), Sinđelić Beograd (2017–(2018)
Danilo Spasojević – Sloga Kraljevo (2013–2014)
Stefan Stanojević – Metalac G.M. (2012–2013), Kolubara Lazarevac (2013–2015), Sloga Kraljevo (2014–(2015), Donji Srem (2015–2016)
Milan Susak – Veternik (2003–2004), ČSK Pivara (2006–2007)
Anthony Trajkovski – Smederevo (2019–2020)
Domenico Velardi - Zlatibor Čajetina (2022–present)
Goran Zarić – RFK Novi Sad (199_–199_), Radnički Beograd (1998–1999), Čukarički Stankom (2002–2004)

Austria 
Miloš Andrejić – BSK Borča (2015–2016)
Josip Bolvari – Spartak Subotica (1983–1984)
Rudolf Chmelicek – Odžaci SK (1938–19__)
Tode Djakovic – Smederevo (2019–2020)
Ludwig Götz – ŠK Amater Sombor (1923)
Grabliker – Budućnost Valjevo (19__–194_)
Lazar Lazarević-Živojinović - Žarkovo (2020-2021)
Saša Lazić – Loznica (2015–2016)
Franz Machek – RFK Bor (1941–1943)
Theodor Mantler – UTK Novi Sad (191_–19__)
Stefan Milojević – Bežanija (2017–2019)
Miroslav Orlic – Dinamo Vranje (2020–2021)
Rastko Rastoka - Zlatibor Čajetina (2022–present)

Azerbaijan 

Murad Hüseynov – Mladost Lučani (2009–2011)
David Samedov – Bežanija (2017–2018)
Branimir Subašić – OFK Beograd (2015–2017)

Barbados 
Abiola Grant – Radnički Sremska Mitrovica (2021–2022)

Belarus 
Ilya Tyunis – Dinamo Vranje (2016–2017)

Belgium 
 Nikola Pejcic - Mačva Šabac (2021-2022)

Bosnia-Herzegovina 
The players that played before 1992 are excluded except for the ones that played for the Bosnian national team.
Admir Aganović – FK Teleoptik (2004–2006), Dinamo Vranje (2006–2007)
Esmir Ahmetović – Sinđelić Beograd (2017–2018)
Mile Andrić – Sloboda Užice (1992–1994, 2001–2002), Sloga Kraljevo (199_–199_), FK Sevojno
Aleksandar Anđić – Jedinstvo Ub (2001–2002), FK Dorćol (2002–2003)
Nemanja Arsenić – Proleter Novi Sad (2009–2010)
Nemanja Arsić – FK Bežanija (2008–2009)
Milun Avramović - Zlatibor Čajetina (2022–present)
Miloš Bajić – Napredak Kruševac (2011–2015), BSK Borča (2016–2017), Smederevo (2019–2020), IMT Beograd (2018–2019,2020–present)
Marko Bjeković – Kabel Novi Sad (2019–present)
Zoran Blagojević – Mladost Apatin (1997–1999)
Slaviša Bogdanović – Radnik Surdulica (2013–2014), BSK Borča (2015–2017), OFK Žarkovo (2018)
Slobodan Bojić – Radnički Sombor (2011–2013, 2014–2015)
Boris Bošković – Mladost Apatin (200_–200_), BSK Borča (2008–2009), Srem S.Mitrovica (2011–present)
Igor Božić – Rad Beograd (2005–2009)
Mario Božić – FK Loznica (2001–2003, 2015–2017), Radnički Stobex (2002–(2003), FK Beograd (2003–2004)
Saša Božić – Dinamo Vranje (2007–2009)
Adnan Cakić – Mačva Šabac (2006–2008)
Anđelko Crnomarković – OFK Mladenovac (2007–2008)
Nedeljko Crnomarković – FK Bežanija (2012–2014)
Enes Curkić – Radnički Pirot (2006–2007)
Sredoje Cvjetičanin – Radnički Beograd, RFK Novi Sad, FK Bor (1998–1999), Rad Beograd, FK Obilić
Benjamin Čalaković – Dinamo Vranje (2019–2020)
Davor Čavrić – Banat Zrenjanin (2007–2012, 2013–2014)
Novica Čomić – Mladost Apatin (2001–2005)
Miroslav Čovilo – RFK Novi Sad (2007–2010)
Marko Čubrilo – FK Teleoptik (2016–2018), OFK Žarkovo (2019)–2020), Budućnost Dobanovci (2019–present)
Siniša Čubrilo – ČSK Pivara (1997–2004)
Nikola Danilović – Sinđelić Beograd (2013)–2014), Dolina Padina (2013–(2014)
Nebojša Desnica – ČSK Pivara (2006–2009), RFK Novi Sad (2010–2011)
Aleksandar Dikić – RFK Novi Sad (2011–2012)
Vladan Dinić – Radnik Surdulica (2014–2015)
Đurađ Dobrijević – FK Teleoptik (2012–2015), Budućnost Dobanovci (2016–2021), Loznica (2022-present)
Boban Dragić – Spartak Subotica (2006–2007)
Dalibor Dragić – Proleter Novi Sad (2009–2010)
Zoran Dragišić – Javor Ivanjica (1995–1996)
Goran Dragović – Radnički Beograd (2001–2002), FK Voždovac (2002–2008)
Ratko Dujković – OFK Kikinda (200_–200_)
Miroslav Dukić – FK Loznica (2013–present)
Ognjen Đelmić – Rad Beograd (2006–2008)
Boban Đerić – FK Inđija (2011–2012), Javor Ivanjica (2017–present)
Gordan Đerić – RFK Novi Sad (2009–2010)
Uroš Đerić – Borac Čačak (2013–2016), Sloboda Užice (2016–2017)
Rade Đokić – Kabel Novi Sad (199_–200_), Srem S.Mitrovica (200_–2004)
Željko Đokić – Javor Ivanjica (2007–2011), FK Zemun (2016–present)
Mladen Đoković – RFK Novi Sad (2011–2012)
Dejan Đogo – Sinđelić Niš (2011–2012), Metalac G.M. (2012–2013)
Aleksandar Đurašović – Mladost Apatin (1997–1999)
Miloš Đurđić – ČSK Pivara (2016–2017)
Saša Đuričić – FK Beograd (20__–20__)
Siniša Đurić – Spartak Subotica (2004–2005)
Velibor Đurić – Proleter Zrenjanin (2003–2004)
Predrag Erak – Sloga Kraljevo (2001–2003)
Borislav Erić – FK Inđija (2013–2014)
Haris Fazlagić – Banat Zrenjanin (2010–2011)
Marko Filipović – Palilulac Beograd (1996–1997), Mladi Radnik (199_–199_), FK Loznica (2002–2003)
Luka Gajić – FK Teleoptik (2013–2014)
Radovan Gajić – Dinamo Pančevo (1998–)
Mladen Galić – Proleter Novi Sad (2011–2012), Bačka Bačka Palanka (2015–2017), OFK Odžaci (2016–2017), TSC Bačka Topola (2017–present)
Miodrag Gigović – BASK Beograd (2006)–2007)
Slobodan Gigović – Dolina Padina (2012–2014)
Dragan Glogovac – Radnički Beograd (1999–2000)
Stevo Glogovac – FK Zvezdara (1995–1997)
Ivan Gluhović – Donji Srem (2015–2017)
Aleksej Golijanin - Grafičar Beograd (2020–present)
Radoslav Golubović – Mladost Luks (–) 
Jovan Golić – Mladost Luks (2002–2005), FK Inđija (2006–2010)
Bojan Gostimirović – FK Inđija (2005–2007)
Slobodan Grbić – Banat Zrenjanin (2012–2014)
Boris Gujić – ČSK Pivara (2006–2008)
Šerif Hasić – FK Novi Pazar (2010–2011)
Nermin Haskić – FK Voždovac (2012–2013)
Alen Holjan – ČSK Pivara (2006–2007)
Luka Ikonić – RFK Novi Sad (2013–2014)
Jovan Ilić - RFK Novi Sad (2022-present)
Filip Ivezić – Proleter Novi Sad (2014–2015)
Maid Jaganjac – FK Inđija (2011–2012)
Vlado Jagodić – Morava Ćuprija (199_–199_)
Adnan Jahić – FK Inđija (2009–2010)
Bojan Jamina – FK Zvezdara (1997–1998)
Nemanja Janičić – FK Bežanija (2011)–2012), Napredak Kruševac (2011–2015)
Stefan Janjić – Bačka Bačka Palanka (2014–2015)
Ognjen Jeftenić – FK Bežanija (2012–2013)
Branko Jelić – Borac Čačak (1995–2000)
Peđa Jerinić – RFK Novi Sad (2012–2013)
Igor Joksimović – Hajduk Beograd (2001–2002), FK Zemun (2006–2008)
Mladen Jovančić – FK Dorćol (2002–2003), Radnički Beograd (2003–2004)
Vladimir Jovančić – BASK Beograd (2005–2007), Rad Beograd (2007–2011)
Branko Jovanović – BASK Beograd (2010–2011)
Jovica Jovanović – FK Bežanija (2015–2016)
Petar Jovanović – Radnički Stobex (2001–2005), Čukarički Stankom (2003–(2004), OFK Mladenovac (2006–2007), FK Sevojno (2009–2010), Jedinstvo Putevi (2012–2013), Zlatibor Čajetina (2019–2020)
Darko Jović – Proleter Novi Sad (2016)–2017), OFK Odžaci (2016–(2017), ČSK Pivara (2017–present)
Aleksandar Kahvić - Grafičar Beograd (2022–present)
Đorđe Kamber – Zastava Kragujevac (1998–2001), Remont Čačak (2001–2002), Mačva Šabac (2004–2006), Srem S.Mitrovica (2005–(2006)
Vedran Kantar – OFK Mladenovac (2007–2008)
Nikola Karanović – Srem S.Mitrovica (2010–2012)
Dragan Kavaz – RFK Novi Sad (1988–1990), Napredak Kruševac (1990–1993)
Igor Kenjalo – FK Bežanija (2012–2014)
Dušan Kerkez – Srem S.Mitrovica, FK Voždovac
Darko Kikanović –  Kolubara Lazarevac (2011–2012)
Nenad Kiso – Zemun (2017–2018, 2019–2020), Žarkovo (2020–present)
Duško Klindo – Mladost Luks (2003–2008)
Arsen Knežević – Kolubara Lazarevac (2019–present)
Igor Kojić – FK Obilić (200_–200_), Rad Beograd (2007–2008), Hajduk Beograd (2008–2009)
Saša Kolunija – FK Bežanija (2005–2007, (2008)–2009, 2014–2015, 2017–2018), FK Voždovac (2007)–2008), FK Zemun (2015–2016)
Dragiša Komarčević – Loznica (2020–present)
Vladanko Komlenović – Mladost Lučani (2008–2010), FK Zemun (2010–2011)
Milivoj Kovačević – FK Inđija (2012–2013)
Bojan Kremenović – Bačka Bačka Palanka (2014–2015), ČSK Pivara (2015–2016)
Sulejman Krpić – Metalac G.M. (2012–2013)
Esad Kuhinja – Napredak Kruševac (1990–1994)
Vladan Kujundžić – Remont Čačak (2001–2003), Metalac G.M. (2006–2008), Banat Zrenjanin (2010–2011)
Radojica Kukolj – FK Loznica (2002–2003)
Nikola Kulašević – FK Inđija (2006–2008)
Miloš Kuljanin – Metalac G.M. (2012–2013)
Milan Lalić – Radnički Kragujevac (2018)–2019), Budućnost Dobanovci (2018–2019), Dinamo Vranje (2019–2020)
Miodrag Latinović – Mačva Šabac (199_–199_)
 Milan Lazarević – Proleter Novi Sad (2015–2017)
Nemanja Lekanić – Sloga Kraljevo (2013–2014), Mačva Šabac (2015–2017), Sinđelić Beograd (2017–2018)
Dejan Limić – FK Jagodina (2007–2008)
Mitar Lukić – Mačva Šabac (1991–199_)
Marinko Mačkić – Mladost Lučani (2000–2003)
Zoran Majstorović – Radnički Beograd (2003–200_)
Mirko Malinović – OFK Kikinda (2001–2003, 2004–(2005), 2007–2009, 2010–2012, 2013–2014), Mladost Apatin (2003–2005), BASK Beograd (2006–2007)
Stevo Malinović – BASK Beograd (2006–2007)
Milenko Malović – Radnički Nova Pazova (2012)–2013), FK Čukarički (2012–(2013), Sinđelić Beograd (2014–2016), Budućnost Dobanovci (2018–present)
Strahinja Manojlović - Mačva Šabac (2020-2022), Grafičar Beograd (2021–2022)
Slavko Marić – Hajduk Beograd (2001–2006), Mladost Lučani (2006–2008)
Jefto Marković – FK Loznica (2007–2011)
Neven Marković – Rad Beograd (2005–2008)
Vladimir Marković – Proleter Novi Sad (2014–2015)
Dragan Matković - Radnički Sremska Mitrovica (2020-2022)
Darjan Matović – FK Inđija (2013–2014)
Nemanja Matović – FK Bežanija (2010–2016), Mačva Šabac (2016–2017), Radnički Pirot (2017)–2018), Sinđelić Beograd (2017–(2018)
Marko Mazalica – Rad Beograd (2005–2007)
Miodrag Medan – Bačka Bačka Palanka (199_–199_), Rad Beograd (199_–1995)
Goran Medenica – FK Zemun (2006–2008)
Nedžad Mehović – FK Novi Pazar (1997–1999)
Almir Memić – RFK Novi Sad (1991)
Samir Memišević – FK Teleoptik (2012–2013, 2013–(2014), FK Bežanija (2013)–2014)
Dragan Mičić – FK Loznica (1993–1996), Banat Zrenjanin (2002–2007)
Marko Mihajlović – RFK Novi Sad (2008-2010), Sloga Kraljevo (2020–present)
Nenad Mijailović – Jedinstvo Ub (2009–(2010)
Borislav Mikić – Železničar Lajkovac (1998–1999), Remont Čačak (2000–2002)
Miroslav Milutinović – ČSK Pivara (2004–2006), Kolubara Lazarevac (2010)–2011, 2013–(2014), RFK Novi Sad (2010–(2011), FK Inđija (2011–2014)
Milan Mirić – FK Bežanija (200_–2010)
Milan Mirić – Sloboda Užice (2017–2019), Zlatibor Čajetina (2018–(2019)
Igor Mišan – Radnički Sombor (2009–2010), RFK Novi Sad (2011–2013)
Jovo Mišeljić – Radnički Niš (1992–1995, 2001–2003), Proleter Zrenjanin (2000–2001), OFK Niš (2003–2004)
Nenad Mišković – Radnički Beograd (1993–1997)
Marko Mitrušić – Metalac G.M. (2012)–2013), OFK Mladenovac (2012–(2013), FK Bežanija (2013–2015, 2016–2017), Donji Srem (2015–2016)
Siniša Mladenović – Sloga Kraljevo (2008–2009, 2010–2014), Grafičar Beograd (2019–2020)
Nikola Mojović – Proleter Novi Sad (2009–2011)
Aleksa Mrđa – Inđija (2018–(2019)
Momčilo Mrkajić – FK Bežanija (2009–2011, (2011)–2012), BSK Borča (2013–2015)
Nemanja Mrkajić – Donji Srem (2010–2012)
Dragan Mučibabić – Hajduk Beograd
Siniša Mulina – Milicionar Beograd (1997–2000)
Igor Muratović – Železničar Beograd (2001–2002), Radnički Beograd (2003–2004, 2005–2006), Radnički Obrenovac (2004–2005)
Stevo Nikolić – OFK Žarkovo (2019–present)
Nenad Novaković – Timok Zaječar (2012–2013)
Muhamed Omić – FK Inđija (2009–2010)
Amer Osmanagić – FK Zemun (2016–2017)
Amir Osmančević – Sloga Kraljevo (2014–2015)
Branko Ostojić – Radnički Kragujevac (2007–2008, 2018–2019)
Aco Pandurević – Železničar Beograd (2001–2002), OFK Mladenovac (2012)–2013)
 Ljubiša Pecelj – Kolubara Lazarevac (2019–2020,2021–present)
Nebojša Pejić – BSK Borča (2006–2011)
Aleksandar Perendija – FK Voždovac (2007–2008)
Saša Perić – OFK Žarkovo (2019–present)
Milovan Petrić – RFK Novi Sad (2012–2013), BSK Borča (2014–2015), Proleter Novi Sad (2015–2016), Kolubara Lazarevac (2016–2017), FK Bečej (2018–2019), Kabel Novi Sad (2019–present)
Novica Petrović – Mladost Apatin (2008–2010), Radnički Sombor (2010–2011), Srem S.Mitrovica (2011–2013)
Almir Pliska – Moravac Mrštane (2014–2015)
Željko Polak – Mačva Šabac (1989–199_), Palilulac Beograd (1998–1999), Radnički Beograd (1999–2000, 2001–2004), FK Bežanija (2004–2006)
Dajan Ponjević - RFK Novi Sad (2010-2011), Proleter Novi Sad (2013-2014), Bačka Bačka Palanka (2014–2017, 2017-2021), OFK Odžaci (2016-(2017), ČSK Čelarevo (2017)-2018), Grafičar Beograd (2021-2022)
Mirko Popadić – FK Bežanija (2013–2014)
Nikola Popara – FK Teleoptik (2009–2012)
Nikola Popin – RFK Novi Sad (2005–2008), ČSK Pivara (2008–2009, 2013–2014), Proleter Novi Sad (2009–2011)
Dejan Popović – FK Inđija (2013–2014), Dinamo Vranje (2019–2020)
Goran Popović – FK Zemun (2007–2008)
Damir Poturović – FK Smederevo (2013–2014)
Ilija Prodanović – Mladost Goša (2002–2003)
Milan Pržulj – Hajduk Beograd (2003–200_)
Velibor Pudar – Čukarički Stankom (1993–1995), Jedinstvo Paraćin (1995–(1996), Palilulac Beograd (1996–1997)
Darko Raca – Mladost Apatin (1997–1998), ČSK Pivara (2009–2010)
Čedomir Radić – OFK Mladenovac (2011–2013), Sinđelić Beograd (2013–2015)
Danko Radić – Sinđelić Beograd (2017–present)
Dušan Radić – FK Loznica (2014–present)
Dragan Radović – Mladi Radnik (1995–1997), Sartid Smederevo (199_–199_)
Slaviša Radović – FK Zemun (2016–2017)
Dragan Rajović – Spartak Subotica (2003–2004, 2006–2007)
Zoran Rajović – FK Vrbas (1997–1999)
Marinko Rastoka – Mladost Lučani (2011–2012)
Rastko Rastoka - Zlatibor Čajetina (2022–present)
Mladen Ratkovica – FK Bečej (2001–2002), FK Bežanija (2002–2003, 2009–2010), Srem S.Mitrovica (2010–2011)
Siniša Ratković – Banat Zrenjanin (2010–present)
Zoran Repac – RFK Novi Sad (200_–2003), FK Beograd (2003–200_)
Ilija Ristanić – Rad Beograd (2007–2008)
Edin Rustemović – Sinđelić Beograd (2013–2014)
Branislav Ružić – Mladost Apatin (2009–2010), Kolubara Lazarevac (2010–2011)
Stefan Santrač – Grafičar Beograd (2018–2020), FK Loznica (2022-present)
Boris Savić – Hajduk Beograd (2008–2009)
Denijel Savić – FK Teleoptik (2010–2012)
Stojan Savić – Mladost Luks (–)
Željko Savić – FK Inđija (2012–2014)
Miloš Sekulović – Napredak Kruševac (2014–2016)
Miljan Sekulović – Dinamo Pančevo (1992–1995, 1997–1999)
Senad Seljimi – Srem Jakovo (2002–2006, 2009–2010), BASK Beograd (2006–2008), ČSK Pivara (2008–2009)
Jovan Sikima – Radnički Pirot (1997–1998), FK Zvezdara (1998–1999), Mladost Apatin (2002–2003)
Milan Simić – Srem S.Mitrovica (2003–2004)
Marko Simović – FK Teleoptik (2017–2018 ), Smederevo (2019–present)
Elvedin Spahić – OFK Niš (2005–2006), FK Novi Pazar (2007–2008)
Milan Srećo – Radnički Stobex (2002–2003), OFK Mladenovac (2007)–2008), FK Zemun (2007–(2008)
Filip Sredojević – OFK Odžaci (2016)–2017)
Duško Stajić – Proleter Zrenjanin (2000–2002)
Valeri Stanić – Kabel Novi Sad (1998–200_), FK Veternik (200_–2004)
Slobodan Stanojlović – FK Loznica (2020–2021)
Saša Stević – Banat Zrenjanin (2008–2010), FK Zemun (201_–2015)
Nenad Studen – FK Teleoptik (2000–2002)
Boško Stupić – OFK Mladenovac (2005–2006)
Nemanja Supić – Radnički Obrenovac (2004)–2005), FK Bežanija (2004–(2005), Čukarički Stankom (2006–2007), FK Voždovac (2007–2008)
Pavle Sušić – Srem S. Mitrovica (2006–2007)
Zoran Šaraba – RFK Novi Sad (2004–2005)
Admir Šarčević – FK Vojvodina (1989–1990), FK Novi Pazar (1992–1993)
Budimir Šarčević – Sinđelić Beograd (2015–2016), Budućnost Dobanovci (2016–2017)
Milomir Šešlija – Sloboda Užice (1991–1992)
Ognjen Šinik – Mladost Apatin (2009–2010), Srem S.Mitrovica (2011–2012), Mladost Lučani (2012–2013), Dinamo Vranje (2015–2016)
Aleksandar Šljivić – FK Bežanija (200_–2010), BASK Beograd (2010–2012)
Nebojša Šodić – Mladost Apatin (2007–2008)
Zoran Šupić – Remont Čačak (2001–2002), Metalac G.M. (2003–2004), FK Bežanija (2004–2006, (2006–2007), BSK Borča (2011–2015), OFK Odžaci (2015–2016)
Srđan Tarbuk – Mačva Šabac (2011–201_)
Amir Teljigović – Proleter Zrenjanin (1986–1992, 2000–2002), Mladi Radnik (2002–2003, 2004–2005)
Sergej Tica – Budućnost Valjevo (199_–199_), Hajduk Beograd (199_–199_), Milicionar Beograd (1997–1998)
Darjan Todorović – Javor Ivanjica (2006–2007), Srem S.Mitrovica (2007–2009), FK Inđija (2011–2013)
Borislav Topić – BSK Borča (2006–2010)
Ranko Torbica – Sloboda Užice (2015–2016)
Bojan Trkulja – Radnički Pirot (2006–2007)
Milorad Trkulja – Mladost Luks (–)
Haris Ukić – FK Novi Pazar (2006–2009)
Nikola Valentić – FK Voždovac (2001–2005), Srem S. Mitrovica (2005–2006), FK Inđija (2015–2016), FK Bežanija (2015–(2016), Sinđelić Beograd (2018–2019)
Dragan Vasić – Mačva Šabac (199_–199_), Sartid Smederevo (199_–199_)
Aleksandar Vasiljević – Budućnost Dobanovci (2004–2005, 2016–2017), FK Bežanija (2005–2008), FK Sevojno (2008–2009), FK Mladi Radnik (2008–2010), Sloga Kraljevo (2014–2015)
Branislav Vasiljević – Proleter Novi Sad (2012–2013), Bačka Bačka Palanka (2015–2016)
Zoran Vasiljević – Sloboda Užice (1992–1995), FK Loznica (199_–199_)
Saša Vidović – Srem Jakovo (2001–2003), Mladost Lux (2003–2004), Rad Beograd (2007–2010), FK Zemun (2010–2011), RFK Novi Sad (2012–present)
Nemanja Vještica – FK Teleoptik (2018–2019), Bačka Bačka Palanka (2020-2022), Zlatibor Čajetina (2022-present)
Danilo Vlačić – FK Bežanija (2009)–2010, 2010–2012), Mladost Apatin (2009–(2010)
Predrag Vladić – Kabel Novi Sad (2018–2020), Radnički Sremska Mitrovica (2021-2022), Kabel Novi Sad (2022-present)
Darko Vojvodić – FK Loznica, Napredak Kruševac, FK Badnjevac, Radnički Kragujevac (199_–199_), Sartid Smederevo (1998–2001), Milicionar Beograd
Zlatko Vojvodić – Sinđelić Beograd (2010–present)
Željko Vranješ – ČSK Pivara (1994–1999)
Igor Vujanović – Železničar Beograd (1999–2000), Remont Čačak (2001–2002)
Filip Vujić – Radnički Sombor (2011–2012), Jedinstvo Putevi (2012–2013)
Filip Vujović – FK Žarkovo (2016–present)
Stefan Vukadin – FK Čukarički (2012–2013), Metalac GM (2017–2019), Grafičar Beograd (2019–present)
Goran Vukliš – OFK Beograd (2016–2017), FK Novi Pazar (2017–2018), Kabel Novi Sad (2019–2020)
Dejan Vukomanović – FK Inđija (2015–2016), FK Novi Pazar (2017–2018)
Bojan Vuković – Proleter Novi Sad (2010–2011)
Zoran Vuković – RFK Novi Sad (2012–2016), ČSK Pivara (2016–2017)
Nikola Zagrađanin – Bane Raška (199_–199_), Borac Čačak (199_–1998)
Milosav Zečić – Sloboda Užice (1998–1999)
Vanja Zekić – FK Bežanija (2016–present)
Borislav Zgonjanin – Proleter Novi Sad (2011–2013)
Mladen Zgonjanin – OFK Odžaci (2015–present)
Ivan Zlatanović – Radnički Niš (2006–2007)
Predrag Živković – Jedinstvo Ub (2005–2006)
Milija Žižić – ČSK Pivara (2006–2007)

Brazil 
Adãozinho (Adão Cleiton Bernardes Pontes) – Srem S.Mitrovica (2006–2007)
Alex (Alex dos Santos Gonçalves) – Teleoptik (2008–2010)
Anderson Costa (Anderson José de Jesús Costa) – Dinamo Pančevo (2002–2004)
Anderson de França (Anderson de França) – Srem S.Mitrovica (2006–2007)
Gabriel Bacan (Gabriel Rocha Bacan) - Rad Beograd (2022-present)
Casimiro (Marcelo da Silva Casimiro) – Inđija (2007–2009)
Dinei (Vatinei César Moreira dos Santos) – Srem S.Mitrovica (2006–2007)
Edmilson (Edmilson de Carvalho Barbosa) – Srem S.Mitrovica (2007–2008)
Eliomar (Eliomar Correia Silva) – Javor Ivanjica (2008–2012, 2015–2018,2021–present)
Erivelto (Erivelto Alixandrino da Silva) – Srem S.Mitrovica (2006–2007)
Fabinho (Fábio de Oliveira Manoel) – Spartak Subotica (2008–2009)
Fábio Ricardo (Fábio Ricardo Sanos Soares) – Srem S.Mitrovica (2006–2007)
Fábio Silva (Fabio Carleandro da Silva) – Rad Beograd (2006–2007)
Franco (Franco Alves de Souza) – Sevojno (2008–2009)
Geovane (Geovani Feital de Oliveira) – Bežanija (2014–2016)
Hegon (Henrique Martins de Andrade) – Jagodina (2016–2018)
Jairon (Jairon Feliciano Damasio) – Radnički Niš (2004–2006)
Kamilo Silva (Kamilo Oliveira da Silva) – Jedinstvo Putevi (2012–2013)
Leandro Pinto (Leandro Climaco Pinto) - RFK Novi Sad (2022-present)
Luis Gustavo (Luis Gustavo Lopes dos Santos) – Bežanija (2014–2016)
Magno (Magno Costa Fernandes) – Bežanija (2014–2015)
Maurício (Maurício Paiva Costa) – Sevojno (2008–2009)
Nathan (Nathan Crepaldi da Cruz) - Rad Beograd (2022-present)
Ricardo Pereira (José Ricardo Pereira dos Santos) – Srem S.Mitrovica (2006–2007)
Pierre (Pierre Ramos Vieira Ladeira) – Sevojno (2008–2009)
Jose Pontes (José António Bernardes Pontes) – Srem S.Mitrovica (2006–2007)
Rafael Carioca (Rafael Felipe Barreto) – Banat Zrenjanin (2008–2010)
Raphael (Raphael José da Silva) – Srem S.Mitrovica (2009–2010)
Ricardinho (Ricardo Silva de Almeida) – Borac Čačak (2012–2014)
Rivan (Rivanilton de França) – Hajduk Beograd (2002–2003)
Rodrigo Leorato aka Preto (Rodrigo Leorato) – Inđija (2008–2009)
Rodrigo Negro (Rodrigo Neves Negro) – Srem S.Mitrovica (2006–2007)
Val Baiano (Jercival Sousa Santos) – Dinamo Vranje (2020–2021), Mladost GAT (2021–2022)
Mateus Viveiros (Mateus Viveiros Andrade) – Bežanija (2017–2018)
Washington Santana (Washington Santana da Silva) – Teleoptik (2008–2010)
William (William Artur de Oliveira) – Srem S.Mitrovica (2006–2008)
William Alves (William Rocha Alves) – Borac Čačak (2008–2013)

Brunei 
Arsen Marjan – Milicionar Beograd (1996–1998), FK Zvezdara (1998–2002), FK Beograd (2003–2004)

Bulgaria 
Nisim Alkalay – Jug Bogdan Prokuplje (1919–1924), Pobeda Niš (1924–1925)
Kiril Chobanov – RFK Novi Sad (2012–2013)
Viktor Gantchev – Radnički Pirot (2019–2020)
Todor Ivanov – Radnički Pirot (1982–1986)
Zoran Janković – Železnik (1994–1998), Inđija (2008–2011)
Ivan Marinov – Radnički Kragujevac (1995–1996)
Mincho Minchev – Radnički Beograd (1990–1992)
Preslav Petrov – Grafičar Beograd (2020–2021)
Dragoljub Simonović – RFK Novi Sad (199_–1997)
Zanko Stoichkov – Šumadija Aranđelovac (1974–1975)
Zlatomir Zagorčić – RFK Novi Sad (1996–1997, 2004–2005)

Burkina Faso 
 Issouf Compaoré – Banat Zrenjanin (2009–2011)
 Dramane Salou – Teleoptik (2018–2019)

Cameroon 
 Theophile Abanda - OFK Mladenovac (2005-2006)
 Thierry Ako – Spartak Subotica (2003–2005, 2007–2008), Inđija (2008–2009), Proleter Novi Sad (2009–2010), Zemun (2010–2011), Radnički Sombor (2011–2012), RFK Novi Sad (2012–2013), BSK Borča (2013–2014)
 Guy Edoa – Radnički Pirot (2019–present)
 Thierry Ekwalla – Čukarički Stankom (2004–2006)
 Hervé Elame - IMT Beograd (2021-2022)
 Lionel Abate Etoundi – OFK Žarkovo (2019–2021)
 Fokim Fon Fondo – Radnik Surdulica (2013–2014)
 Ferdinand Fru Fon – Temnić Varvarin (2017–2018)
 Simon Tjeck Migne – Sloboda Užice (2018–2019)
 Michel Vaillant – Napredak Kruševac (2014–2015), Trayal Kruševac (2018), Budućnost Dobanovci (2020–present)
Ibrahim Walidjo – Javor Ivanjica (2012–2015), ČSK Pivara (2017–2018), Loznica (2020–2022)

Canada 
Milan Božić – Hajduk Beograd (2002–2005), Inđija (2006–2007)
Nikola Bursać - Radnički Sremska Mitrovica (2021-2022)
Derek Cornelius – Javor Ivanjica (2016–2019)
Erik Hermanns – Budućnost Dobanovci (2021–2022), Radnički Beograd (2022–present)
Boban Kajgo – Hajduk Beograd (2007–2011)
Steve Knezevic – Budućnost Dobanovci (2016–2017)
Jovan Lučić – Bežanija (2016–2017), Budućnost Dobanovci (2020–present), Rad Beograd (2021–present)
Aleksa Marković – Zemun (2015–2016), Inđija (2017)–2018)
Filip Prostran – Mladost Apatin (2009–2010)
Igor Prostran – Remont Čačak (2002–2004)
Mike Stojanovic – Radnički Kragujevac (1969–1973)

Chad 
Misdongarde Betolngar – Mladost Lučani (2012–2014), Borac Čačak (2013–(2014), Sloga Kraljevo (2014–2015)

Chile
Sebastián Guerrero – Sinđelić Beograd (2013–2014)

China
 Chi Jiahong – Metalac G.M. (2019–2020)
 Deng Yanlin – Zemun (2019–2020)
 Dong Li – Metalac G.M. (2019–2021), Radnički Sremska Mitrovica (2021–2022), Zlatibor Čajetina (2022-present)
 Huang Yishen - Kabel Novi Sad (2021–2022), Rad Beograd (2022-present)
 Lai Qirui – Sinđelić Beograd (2018–present)
 Li Siqi – Smederevo (2019)–2020)
 Liu Bin – Bežanija (2017–2018)
 Liu Bo – Sinđelić Beograd (2013–2014)
 Pan Qi – Jagodina (2016–2017)
 Tan Jiajie – Sinđelić Beograd (2018–present)
 Yimuran Kuerban – Sinđelić Beograd (2018–present)
 Wang Jiahui – Sloga Kraljevo (2020-2021), Trayal Kruševac (2022–present)
 Wang Lei – Temnić Varvarin (2017–2018)
 Yang Chenyu – Radnički Pirot (2017–2018)
 Yao Xuchen – Radnički Pirot (2017–2018)
 Yuhao Wang – Sloboda Užice (2018–2019)
 Zeng Qingshen – Smederevo (2019–2020)
 Zhang Meng – Sinđelić Beograd (2019–present)
 Zhang Yue – Bežanija (2018)–2019), Sinđelić Beograd (2018–present)
 Zhang Wu – Temnić Varvarin (2017–2018),  Trayal Kruševac (2018–2019)
 Zhong Haoran – Proleter Novi Sad (2016–2017)
 Zhu Zhengyu – BSK Borča (2016–2017)

Congo 
 Prestige Mboungou – Metalac G.M. (2019–2021,2021-2022)

Côte d'Ivoire 

 Herve Amani – Radnički Kragujevac (2017–2018), Javor Ivanjica (2018–2019)
 Achille Anani – Dinamo Vranje (2015–2016)
 Kouao Desire Bako – Budućnost Dobanovci (2020–2021)
 Alassane Diaby – Dinamo Vranje (2015–2016)
 Modibo Kané Diarra – ČSK Pivara (2006–2007)
 Ismaël Béko Fofana – IMT Beograd (2020–2021)
 Ferdinand Kanga Moaye - Loznica (2022-present)
 Bayéré Junior Loué – Železničar Pančevo (2021–2022)
 Marcel Metoua – Banat Zrenjanin (2008–2011)
 Mohamed Sylla – Radnički Sremska Mitrovica (2021–2022)
 Aboubacar Toure - Timok Zaječar (2021-2022)

Croatia 
The players that have played for the Croatian National Team are in bold, the others have played since 1992.
Predrag Alić – Napredak Kruševac (2010–2011)
Vedran Bjelajac – Proleter Zrenjanin (2003–2006)
Matteo Brdar – Inđija (2013–2015)
Dražen Cvjetković – Čukarički Stankom (1991–1994), Spartak Subotica (2001–2007)
Ivan Cvjetković – Rad Beograd (1985–1987)
 Damjan Daničić – Grafičar Beograd (2018–2019)
Dragan Dobrić – Dinamo Vranje (2010–2011)
Stevica Dujaković – Rad Beograd (2003–2005)
Duško Dukić – Vlasina (2006–2007), Jagodina (2007–2008, 2010–2014, 2016–2017)
Nikola Gavrić – Sloboda Užice (2018–2019)
Boris Gospojević – Proleter Novi Sad (2010–2011)
Ronald Habi – OFK Kikinda (1996–1998)
Nebojša Ivančević – Inđija (2017–2019), Radnički Kragujevac (2019–2020), Budućnost Dobanovci (2020)–2021)
Miro Ivković – Napredak Kruševac (2005–2006)
Radovan Ivković – Bačka Bačka Palanka (2008–2010, 2012–2018)
Srđan Ivković – Bačka Bačka Palanka (2014–2015)
Ilija Knezić – Big Bull Radnički (2010–2011)
Ardian Kozniku – Priština (1988–1990)
Dario Krivokuća – Inđija (2012–2015)
Slaven Lakić – Radnički Sombor (2001–2006, 2009–present)
Denis Lazinica – Spartak Subotica (2008–2009)
Darko Lunc – Železničar Pančevo (2021–present)
Davor Magoč – ČSK Pivara (2004–2008, 2009–2010), RFK Novi Sad (2011–2012)
Denis Malešević – Kabel Novi Sad (1999–2000)
Slavko Mandić – Bor (1998–1999)
Dušan Martić – Mladost Apatin (2005–2007)
Boris Miljković – Sinđelić Niš (2007–2011)
Todor Mizdrak – OFK Mladenovac (2010–2012), Smederevo (2013–201x)
Arian Mršulja – Smederevo (2019–2020)
Miroslav Pavlović – ČSK Pivara (2001–2004, 2004–2011, 2013–present), Budućnost Banatski Dvor (2004)–2005)
Predrag Počuča – BSK Borča (2016–2017), Inđija (2017)–2018), Sinđelić Beograd (2017–(2018)
Uroš Puskas – Srem S. Mitrovica (2011–2012), RFK Novi Sad (2012–2013)
Nikola Rudnicki – Banat Zrenjanin (2009–2010, 2013–2014), RFK Novi Sad (2010–2011)
Kujtim Shala – Liria Prizren (1981–1983), Priština (1984–1989)
Zoran Stamenić – ČSK Pivara (1998–2004, 2004–2006), Mladost Apatin (2005–2007)
Dragan Trešnjić – Spartak Subotica (2003–2005)
Mile Vujasin – Inđija (2011–2013, 2015–2018), Radnički Kragujevac (2018–2019), Kolubara Lazarevac (2019–2020)

Cyprus
Siniša Gogić – Radnički Niš (1982–1986)
 Alexander Spoljaric – OFK Beograd (2014–2017)
Vladan Tomić – Mačva Šabac (1988–1989)

Czech Republic 
 Vladan Binić - Radnik Surdulica (2014-2015)
 Karlo Brener – PSVD (1900)
 Gustav Greifahr – Soko Beograd (1896)
 Marko Stanojkoviĉ – Dinamo Vranje (2020–2021)
 Zdeněk Vořechovský – Remont Čačak (2002–2003)

Denmark 
Michael Hansen Schon – ČSK Pivara (2009–2010)

Ecuador 
Augusto Batioja – RFK Novi Sad (2009–2010)

El Salvador 
Vladan Vicevic – Sloboda Užice (1986–1992, 1999–2002)

England 
 Benjamin Agyeman-Badu – Sloboda Užice (2017–2018)
 Kal Malass – Timok Zaječar (2021–2022)
 Stefan Vukoje - Sloboda Užice (2022-present)

France 

 Loic Akpo – Dinamo Vranje (2020–2021)
 Mohamed Bangoura – Jagodina (2020–2021)
 Mathias Dimizas – Dinamo Vranje (2016–2017)
 David Marinković – Banat Zrenjanin (2012–2015), Bačka Bačka Palanka (2015–2016)
 Marko Muslin – Hajduk Beograd (2003–2004)
 Hugo Rouxel - Inđija (2022–present)
 Nikola Stojanović – Zlatibor Čajetina (2019–2020), Jagodina (2020–present)

Gambia
 Abdou Faye – Trayal Kruševac (2019)–2020)
 Adama Jarjue – Sloga Kraljevo (2020–2021)
 Lamin Jobe – Trayal Kruševac (2018–2020)
 Ousman Joof – Trayal Kruševac (2018–2021, 2022-present)
 Ousman Marong – Trayal Kruševac (2018–2019), Grafičar Beograd (2019–2020,2020–2021)

Georgia 
Levan Injgia – Radnički Sremska Mitrovica (2020–2021)
Artur Mkrtichyan – ČSK Pivara (2016–2018)
Imeda Putkaradze – Novi Pazar (2010–2011)
Akaki Tskarozia – Bežanija (2008–2010)
Davit Volkovi – Zemun (2016–2017)

Germany 
 Daniel Arsovic – Čukarički Stankom (200_–200_)
 Mirko Bulatović - Teleoptik (2018-2019)
 Milan Delević – Žarkovo (2021–2022), Loznica (2022)-2023), IMT Beograd (2022–present)
 Aleksandar Erak – TSC Bačka Topola (2016–2019), Bečej (2018)–2019)
 Johann Graf – Palilulac Beograd (1932–1933)
 Stefan Kukoljac – Sinđelić Beograd (2016–2017)
 Irsen Latifović – Novi Pazar (1995–1996), Napredak Kruševac (1996–1997)
 Danijel Milovanović – Bežanija (2008–2009)
 Marko Mišković – Bežanija (2015–2019)
 Karl Otterbein – Bačka Subotica (193x–1949)
 Aleksandro Petrovic – Zemun (2006–2008)
 Matthias Predojević – RFK Novi Sad (1997)–1998), Milicionar Beograd (1997–1999), Javor Ivanjica (2000–2002)
 Thomas Vasov – Timok Zaječar (19__–1993), Borac Čačak (1993–1996)
 Marc Phillipp Wessner – Dinamo Vranje (2020–2021)

Ghana 
Rashid Abubakar - Loznica (2022-present)
Sadick Abubakar – Smederevo (2019–2020), Radnički Sremska Mitrovica (2020–present)
Abdul Alhassan – Grafičar Beograd (2021–2022)
Yaw Antwi – Bežanija (2012–2013), Timok Zaječar (2013–2014), Inđija (2014–2017)
Bismarck Appiah – Sloga Petrovac na Mlavi (2013–2015), Proleter Novi Sad (2016–2017)
Stephen Appiah – Trayal Kruševac (2018–2019)
Melvin Banda – Sloga Petrovac na Mlavi (2013–2015)
Joseph Bempah – Sloboda Užice (2018–2019), Radnički Pirot (2019–2020), Borac Čačak (2020–2021)
Ronal Bortey – Srem S.Mitrovica (2010–2011)
Francis Bossman – Sloboda Užice (2010–2012, 2014–2015), Sloga Petrovac na Mlavi (2013–2014)
Joseph Cudjoe – Radnik Surdulica (2013–2015)
Abraham Frimpong – Napredak Kruševac (2011–2017)
Alidu Harif Mohammed – Napredak Kruševac (2013–2014)
Zubairu Ibrahim - Jedinstvo Ub (2022–present)
Kwaku Karikari - Jedinstvo Ub (2022–present)
Owusu-Ansah Kontoh – Metalac G.M. (2011–2015)
Maxwell Mensah – Temnić Varvarin (2017–2018)
Abdul Majeed Muiz – Grafičar Beograd (2021–2022), Metalac G.M. (2022–present)
Baba Musah – Trayal Kruševac (2018–2021)
Ibrahim Mustapha – Radnički Sremska Mitrovica (2021–2022)
Justice Neequaye – Sloboda Užice (2018–2019)
Abdul Rashid Obuobi – Sloga Kraljevo (2013–2014), Donji Srem (2014–2016), Borac Čačak (2020–2021), Zlatibor Čajetina (2021–present)
Godwin Osei Bonsu – Radnik Surdulica (2013–2014)
Samuel Owusu – Radnik Surdulica (2014–2016)
Maxwell Quaye - Loznica (2022-present)
Obeng Regan – Napredak Kruševac (2012–2014), Železničar Pančevo (2021–present)
Zakaria Suraka – Sloga Petrovac na Mlavi (2013–2014), Inďija (2014–2015), Dinamo Vranje (2016–2019), Železničar Pančevo (2020–present)
Ibrahim Tanko – Bežanija (2018–2019), Javor Ivanjica (2020–present)

Greece 
 Nikolaos Antoniadis – Kabel Novi Sad (2021–present)
 Theodoros Apostolidis – Bor (1969–1972)
 Konstantinos Galeadis – Radnički Pirot (2019–2020)
 Anastasio Galinis – Radnički Obrenovac (2004–2005)
 Dimitris Koxidis – Sloga Kraljevo (2013–2014)
 Lefteris Matsoukas – Dinamo Vranje (2018–2020)
 Todor Mistakidis – Bačka Subotica
 Yiannis Nestoras – ČSK Pivara (2016–2018)
 Asterios Oikonomikos – Dinamo Vranje (2020–2021), Zlatibor Čajetina (2021–2022)
 Athanasios Stoinovits - Zlatibor Čajetina (2022-2023)
 Dimitrios Tsinovits – IMT Beograd (2017–2018,2019–present), Sinđelić Beograd (2018–2019)

Guatemala 
Adolfo Alvarez – ČSK Pivara (2017–2018)

Guinea 

 Amadou Bailo – Novi Pazar (2010–2011)
 Fodé Camara - RFK Novi Sad (2022-present)
 Ibrahima Sory Camara – Zemun (2015–2016)

Honduras 
Luis López – Srem S.Mitrovica (2010)–2011), Novi Pazar (2010–(2011)

Hong Kong 
Dejan Antonić – Napredak Kruševac (1990–1992)
Anto Grabo – RFK Novi Sad (1986–1988)
Enson Kwok – Timok Zaječar (2021-2022), Mačva Šabac (2022–present)

Hungary

János Báki – Kabel Novi Sad (1937–1941)
Predrag Bošnjak – RFK Novi Sad (2006–2008), Proleter Novi Sad (2009–2010)
Zoltán Búrány – Spartak Subotica (200_–2006)
Gyula Ellbogen – Juda Makabi (1922–1923), Sparta Zemun (1923)
István Gligor – Spartak Subotica (1974–1976), FK Crvenka (1977–1978), OFK Kikinda (1979–1980)
Zoltán Horváth – Spartak Subotica (1983–1986)
 Zoltan Inotai – Sport Subotica (1921–192x), Juda Makabi (193x–193x)
Zsombor Kerekes – FK Bečej (1990–1996)
Nikola Kodzic - Budućnost Dobanovci (2021-2022), IMT Beograd (2022–present)
László Köteles – FK Bežanija (2004–2005)
Sándor Krizán – OFK Kikinda (1990–1991)
László Némedi – FK Bor (1959–1961)
Károly Nemes – NAK Novi Sad (1919–1924)
István Nyers – ŽAK Subotica (1941–1945)
Norbert Pintér – TSC Bačka Topola (2018–2019)
Ferenc Plattkó – KAFK Kula (1921–1923)
Adrián Potloka – OFK Kikinda (200_–2007)
Zsolt Radics – Mladost Apatin (199_–1998)
David Sinkovics – TSC Bačka Topola (2016–2020)
Vilmos Sipos – Građanski S.Mitrovica (1930–1931)
Tojvas – ŽAK Subotica (1924–1925)
László Varga – Bačka Subotica (1941–1949)
Marko Varga – Kabel Novi Sad (2020–present)

India 
 Swapnil Raj Dhaka – Sinđelić Beograd (2018–2019)
 Dhruv Vikram Singh - Timok Zaječar (2021–2022)
 Rahul Soni – Žarkovo (2018–2019), Borac Čačak (2020-2021)

Indonesia 
 Ilija Spasojević – ČSK Pivara (2006–2007)

Iran 
Houtan Delfi – Proleter Novi Sad (2011–2014)

Iraq 
Ibrahim Salim Saad – Dubočica Leskovac (2000–2001)
Mohamad Shamkhi – Budućnost Dobanovci (2021–present)

Israel 
Slobodan Drapić – RFK Novi Sad (1984–1986)

Italy
Stefano Andreata – FK Inđija (2012–2015)
Antonio Balduini – FK Bor (1953–1955)
Arnoldo Balduini – FK Bor (1953–1954)
Gaston Balduini – FK Bor (1952–1954)
Giovanni Balduini – FK Bor (1920–192_)
Arbri Dedja – FK Inđija (2014–2016)

Jamaica
 Norman Campbell – Grafičar Beograd (2020–2021)
 Duncan McKenzie - Grafičar Beograd (2022–present)

Japan 

Kazuo Honma – Mačva Šabac (2003–2005)
Hiroya Kiyomoto – Zlatibor Čajetina (2019–2020)
Gentaro Murakami – Jagodina (2016–2017)
Ryo Tachibana – Zlatibor Čajetina (2019–2020)
Masafumi Takatsuka (Mabo) – Bane Raška (2002–2005)
Yoshikato Uchino – Mačva Šabac (2002–2005)
Takuto Yasuoka – OFK Beograd (2016–2017)

Kazakhstan 
 Nenad Erić – Big Bul Bačinci (2002–2003), Mačva Šabac (2003–2005)
 Izat Kulzhanov – Radnički Kragujevac (2020–2021)

Kenya 
 Brian Berry Odhiambo – Inđija (2012–2013)
 Albert Muema – Sinđelić Beograd (2018–2019)
 Richard Odada – Grafičar Beograd (2019–2020)

Korea (South)
Hwang Jong-won – Radnički Kragujevac (2018)–2019), OFK Žarkovo (2018–(2019), Smederevo (2019–2020)
Jang Hyeok-jin – Sloga Kraljevo (2014–2015)
Jo Min-se – ČSK Pivara (2017–2018)
Kim Chang-seong – Sloga Kraljevo (2013–2014)
Kim Do-hyun – Bežanija (2017–2018)
Kim Seon-il – Radnički Niš (2011–2012)
Kim Young-moon – Sloga Kraljevo (2014–2015)
Lee Gee-hyeon – Zlatibor Čajetina (2019)–2020), Trayal Kruševac (2019–(2020)
Lee Je-myeong – Sloga Kraljevo (2013–2014)
Lee Jong-chan – Budućnost Dobanovci (2020–2021), Rad Beograd (2021–present)
Lee Joon-so - Zemun (2019-2020)
Lee San-hyeon – Bežanija (2007–2010)
Lim Chang-jong – Radnički Nova Pazova (2012–2013)
Park Chan-sol – Bežanija (2016–2018)
Park Ji-han – Bežanija (2014–2015)
Park Tae-gyu – Bežanija (2007–2010)
Sang Ghyeok-seo – Sloga Kraljevo (2014–2015)
Shim Tae-soo – Sloboda Užice (2017–2018)
Son Joon-hyo – Bežanija (2017–2018)
Woo Chun-yong – Mladost Apatin (2009–2010)
Yu Dong-gyu – Bežanija (2014–2016), ČSK Pivara (2017–2018)
Yoon Sang-young – BSK Borča (2016–201x)
Yun Tae-ho – Inđija (2014–2015)

Kosovo 
Counting only clubs outside Kosovo, or inside Kosovo for internationals before declaration of independence.
Edin Ahmeti – OFK Mladenovac (2006–2007)
Halil Asani – ČSK Pivara (1997–2000, 2002–2007), Proleter Novi Sad (2007–2012)
Filip Berisha – Budućnost Dobanovci (2018–2019)
Amir Bislimi – Proleter Novi Sad (2008–2010)
Enis Fetahu – Bor (2003–2004)
Sead Gorani – Železnik (1998–2001)
Muhamed Ilazi – Dubočica Leskovac (2001–2006, 2008–2013)
 Besnik Kollari – Novi Pazar (1995–1996)
 Rahmani Kurti – Novi Pazar (1995–1996)
 Shefqet Kurti – Novi Pazar (1995–1996)
Memiš Limani – RFK Novi Sad (1991–1992)
Enes Maliqi – ZSK Valjevo (2001–2002), FK Beograd (2002–2010)
Ajazdin Nuhi – Čukarički Stankom (1997–2001)
Hajzerdzan Ramadani – Palilulac Beograd (1997–1998)
Edi Sulejmani – Palilulac Beograd (1998–1999)

Kuwait  
Ahmad Al-Saqer – Sinđelić Beograd (2017–2018)

Kyrgyzstan  
Viktor Kelm – Bežanija (2016–2017)

Latvia 
Oļegs Karavajevs – OFK Beograd (1990–1993)

Lebanon
 Muhamad Jawad Abdallah – Budućnost Dobanovci (2018–2019)
 Mohamad Shamkhi - Budućnost Dobanovci (2021–present)

Lesotho 
Thapelo Tale – Srem S.Mitrovica (2011–2012)

Liberia 
Omega Roberts – Donji Srem (2015–2016,2021–present), Žarkovo (2018)–2019), Novi Pazar (2018–(2019), Budućnost Dobanovci (2019–2020)

Lithuania 
Tomas Dapkus – Dinamo Vranje (2015–2016)

Libya 
 Mahdi Majid – Donji Srem (2015–2017)

Malaysia 
 Adam Hamid – IMT Beograd (2020–2021)
 Omar Raiyan - Grafičar Beograd (2022-present)

Mali 
Issa Hare Diawara – Zemun (2015–2018)

Malta 
 Nenad Veselji – OFK Beograd (1988–1994)
 Jamie Zerafa – Inđija (2018–2019)

Moldova 
Dimitrie Moşneagă – Mladi Radnik (2010–2011)
Sergiu Diulgher – Sloboda Užice (2018–2019)

Mongolia 
Murun Altankhuyag – Mačva Šabac (2014–2015)

Montenegro 
Incomplete
 Zoran Aković – Novi Pazar (2018–present)
 Danilo Bracanović – Zlatibor Čajetina (2019–2020)
 Božidar Bujiša – Zlatibor Čajetina (2019–present)
 Bojan Bulatović – Novi Pazar (2018–present)
 Drago Bumbar – Sinđelić Beograd (2018–present)
 Stefan Dabetić – FK Voždovac (2011–2013)
 Mitar Ćuković – Proleter Novi Sad (2017–present)
 Danilo Dašić – Zlatibor Čajetina (2019–2020)
 Marko Despotović – FK Bežanija (2018–present)
 Marko Drašković – BASK Beograd (2017–(2018), Sloga Despotovac (2018–2019), Borac Šakule (2019)–2020), Borac Čačak (2019–2020), Trayal Kruševac (2020–present)
 Lazar Đokić – FK Zemun (2015)–2016), Dinamo Vranje (2016–2017, 2018–present), Metalac GM (2017–2018)
 Vuk Đurić – Sloboda Užice (2005–2007, (2011)–2012, 2015–2016), FK Srem (2009–2011), FK Voždovac (2011–2013), Jedinstvo Putevi (2013–2015, 2017–present)
 Nemanja Gojačanin – Javor Ivanjica (2013–2016)
 Tigran Goranović – Sinđelić Beograd (2016–2017, 2019–2020), Dinamo Vranje (2019–2021)
 Boško Guzina – Bežanija (2017–(2018), Teleoptik (2018–present)
 Milovan Ilić – Sloboda Užice (2018–2019)
 Milan Jelovac – Metalac G. M. (2017–2020), Radnički Sremska Mitrovica (2020–present)
 Asmir Kajević – BSK Borča (2008–2012)
 Filip Kasalica - Mačva Šabac (2006-2007), Srem S. Mitrovica (2007-2008), Grafičar Beograd (2022-present)
 Šaleta Kordić – RFK Novi Sad (2012–2013), BSK Borča (2014–2015), Železničar Pančevo (2022-present)
 Alija Krnić – Javor Ivanjica (2017–present)
 Nikola Krstinić – Banat Zrenjanin (2009–2011, 2013–2016)
 Nikola Krstović – Grafičar Beograd (2019–2020)
 Mijat Lambulić - Grafičar Beograd (2021–present)
 Bojan Magud – Zemun (2015–2018)
 Marko Milikić - Radnički Pirot (2020-(2021), OFK Žarkovo (2021-2022), Železničar Pančevo (2022-present)
 Drago Milović – OFK Žarkovo (2018–present)
 Filip Mitrović – Novi Pazar (2019–2020)
 Sava Mugoša – Sinđelić Beograd (2015)–2016)
 Bojica Nikčević – Radnički Pirot (2019–present)
 Nemanja Nikolić – Grafičar Beograd (2020–2021)
 Petar Pavlićević – Kabel Novi Sad (2019–present)
 Nikola Pejović – Zemun (2020–present)
 Ognjen Peličić – Sloboda Užice (2017)–2018), FK Teleoptik (2018–present)
 Mladen Popović – Dinamo Vranje (2019–present)
 Stefan Popović – Dinamo Vranje (2019–present)
 Stefan Račković – Bežanija (2014–(2015), Donji Srem (2015–(2016)
 Vasilije Radenović – Kolubara (2013–2016), BSK Borča (2016–2017), Proleter Novi Sad (2017–2018), OFK Žarkovo (2018–2019, 2019–2020)
 Dragoljub Radoman - Sloboda Užice (2022-present)
 Aleksandar Radović – Hajduk Beograd (2007–2008)
 Andrija Radulović - Grafičar Beograd (2021-2022)
 Bogdan Rmuš – FK Novi Pazar (2018–present)
 Peđa Savić – Teleoptik (2015–present)
 Petar Sekulović – Teleoptik (2017–2018)
 Janko Simović – Metalac G.M. (2007–2008), Dinamo Vranje (2019–2020)
 Marko Stanovčić – FK Bežanija (2009–2012, 2013–2015), FK Inđija (2014–2015)
 Nemanja Šćekić – Sinđelić Beograd (2014–2017), OFK Žarkovo (2018–present)
 Boris Tatar – Budućnost Dobanovci (2019–2020)
 Mihailo Tomković – Zlatibor Čajetina (2018–present)
 Stefan Vico - Grafičar Beograd (2022-present)
 Marko Vidović – Sloga Kraljevo (2020–present)
 Filip Vorotović – FK Teleoptik (2016–2017, 2018–present)
 Predrag Vujović – Napredak Kruševac (2001–2005, 2007–2010), FK Novi Pazar (2010–2011), FK Metalac G.M. (2012–2014), FK Loznica (2015–2016)
Bojan Zogović – Radnički Sombor (2007–2009, (2010)–2011) – Banat Zrenjanin (2009–2010, 2010–2011), Timok Zaječar (2012–2014), Metalac G.M. (2014–2016,2017–2018), Bačka Bačka Palanka (2018–2019), Kolubara Lazarevac (2020–present)

Netherlands
 Aleksandar Janković – Sloboda Užice (2017–2018)
 Ralph Kerrebijn – Žarkovo (2020–2021), Budućnost Dobanovci (2021–2022)

New Zealand 
 Adam Mitchell – OFK Beograd (2016)–2017)

Nigeria 
Abel Abah - Metalac G.M. (2022–present)
Victor Agboh – BSK Borča (2001–2002), Žitorađa (2002)–2003), Novi Pazar (2005–2006), Mladost Apatin (2007–2008)
Nnaemeka Ajuru – Javor Ivanjica (2004–2005, 2006–2009), Jagodina (2017–2018), Sloboda Užice (2018–2019)
Victor Amos – Sloga Kraljevo (2020–2021), Trayal Kruševac (2022-present)
Shedrack Charles - IMT Beograd (2021–present)
Ayogueke Chibueze – Moravac Orion (2014–2015), Bežanija (2015–2016)
Eleanya Kelechi Collins – Kolubara Lazarevac (2001–2003), Mladost Apatin (2007–2008)
Ezeh Chinedu – Kosanica (2004–2008)
Emeka Emerun – Sloboda Užice (2015–2017), Radnički Pirot (2017–2018), Budućnost Dobanovci (2018–2022)
Ikechukwu Ezeh – Hajduk Beograd (2007–2008)
Frederick Famakinwa – Radnički Pirot (2007–2008)
Mark Geff – Novi Pazar (2003–2004), Kosanica (2004–2005)
Ifekwe Godswill – Temnić Varvarin (2017–present)
Stanley Ibe – Javor Ivanjica (2001–2002)
Ifeanyi Igbodo – BSK Borča (2000–2002), Javor Ivanjica (2002–2004, 2007–2008), FK Beograd (2003–(2004), Vlasina Vlasotince (2004–2005)
Kennedy Ikporo - IMT Beograd (2022-present)
Victor Jideonwor – Javor Ivanjica (2005–2008)
Moses John – Novi Pazar (2019)–2020), Smederevo (2019–(2020), Sloga Kraljevo (2020–present)
Gideon Kadiri – Sloboda Užice (2018–2019)
Peter Kolawole – Sloboda Užice (2017–2018)
Adekunle Lukmon – Borac Čačak (2002–2005)
Damien Maduba – Timok Zaječar (2021–present)
Cyril Nebo – Kabel Novi Sad (2019–2020), Jagodina (2020–present)
Kingsley Nnaji – Jagodina (2020–2021), Timok Zaječar (2021–present)
Samuel Nnamani – Sloga Petrovac na Mlavi (2013–2014), Donji Srem (2015–2016), Sloboda Užice (2016–2018)
Augustine Nwagwu – Metalac GM (2017–2018)
Kelvin Obasi – ČSK Pivara (2017–2018)
Michel Odinakachakwu – Novi Pazar (2007–2008)
Obiora Odita – Javor Ivanjica (2003–2005, (2006)–2007, (2010)–2011, 2011–2012,2021–2022), Železničar Pančevo (2022–present)
Ugochukwu Oduenyi - Javor Ivanjica (2021–present) 
Kingsley Chukwudi Ogbonnaya – Srem S.Mitrovica (200_–200_)
Ikechukwu Ojukwu – Novi Pazar (2005–2006)
Martins Okafor – Jagodina (2020–2021), Timok Zajecar (2021–present)
Eze Vincent Okeuhie – Metalac GM (2017–2018)
Livinus Okorie – Sloboda Užice (2018–2019)
Franklin Azubuike Ononaobi aka Frank Doski – Zemun (2015–2016)
Obele Okeke Onyebuchi – Železničar Beograd (2001–2002), Radnički Kragujevac (2002–2003)
Reuben Okoro – Sloga Kraljevo (2013–2014), Sloga Petrovac na Mlavi (2014)–2015), Mačva Šabac (2014–2015)
Emmanuel Oletu – Spartak Subotica (2008–2010)
Peter Omoduemuke – Obilić (2004–2007)
Okomajin Segun Onimisi – Sloga Kraljevo (2014)–2015), BSK Borča (2015–2016), Dinamo Vranje (2016–2020), Dubočica Leskovac (2020–2022)
Henry Onyilo – Inđija (2013–2014)
Peter Taiye Oladotun – Bežanija (2008–2009)
Raphael Remingus Governor – Kolubara Lazarevac (2014–2015)
Kayode Seliman - Zlatibor Čajetina (2022-present)
Olatunji Sulaimon Teslim – Inđija (2013–2014)
Emmanuel Udeh – BSK Borča (2015–2016)
Emeka Jude Ugali – FK Beograd (1998–1999)
Dante Charles Ugwu – Moravac Orion (2014–2015)
Prince Ukachukwu - IMT Beograd (2022-present)

North Macedonia 
The players that have played for the Macedonian National Team are in bold, the others have played since 1992.
Ahmet Ahmetović – FK Novi Pazar (1997–1999)
Muhamet Ajvazi – BSK Borča (2016–2017)
Fikret Alomerović – Radnički Niš (199_–199_)
Aleksa Amanović – Javor Ivanjica (2015–2020)
Stefan Andrić – Radnički Kragujevac (2014–2016), Radnički Beograd (2022-present)
Igor Angelovski – Srem S.Mitrovica (2009–2010)
Stefan Aškovski – FK Teleoptik (2009–2012)
Boban Avramovski – Kolubara Lazarevac (2008–2009)
Sava Avramovski – Grafičar Beograd (2021–present)
Vlado Blazeski – Sloga Kraljevo (2001–2005)
Nikola Bogdanovski – FK Bežanija (2018–2019), OFK Žarkovo (2019)–2020), FK Novi Pazar (2019–2020, 2022–present)
Dragan Čadikovski – Kolubara Lazarevac (1997–2001, 2014–2015, 2016–2019)
Cvetanovski – FK Bežanija (2001–2002)
Ivica Cvetanovski – Sloboda Užice (1989–1993, 1993–1996)
Olivio Dautovski – Topličanin Prokuplje (1989–1995)
Filip Despotovski – FK Bežanija (2004–2005), Mačva Šabac (2005–2007)
Stefan Despotovski - Grafičar Beograd (2021-2022)
Milan Dimovski – Topličanin Prokuplje (1993–1994)
Lazar Djorejlievski – FK Bežanija (2015–2016)
Mario Đurovski – FK Bežanija (2003–2008)
Dušan Filimanovski – FK Bežanija (2010–2013), Metalac GM (2013–2014)
Jane Gavalovski – Rad Beograd (1998–2004), Mačva Šabac (1997–1998, 2005–2007)
 Georgijevski – Rudar Bor (1989–1993)
Marko Gjorgjievski – Radnički Pirot (2020–2021)
Igor Ilić – Jedinstvo Ub (2004–2005)
Ismail Ismaili – FK Priština (199_–199_)
Filip Jančevski – Hajduk Kula (2014–2017)
Georgije Jankulov – Železničar Pančevo (2020–present)
Aleksa Jordanov - Trayal Kruševac (2021–present)
Stefan Josifoski – Zemun (2010–2011, 2013–(2014), Inđija (2011–2012)
Hristijan Kirovski – FK Veternik (2003–(2004), Mačva Šabac (2004–2006)
Vlatko Kolev – Napredak Kruševac (200_–2002), Metalac G.M. (2002–2003)
Tihomir Kostadinov – Moravac Orion (2014–2015)
Antonio Krstanoski – Moravac Orion (2014–2015)
Strahinja Krstevski – Proleter Novi Sad (2016–2019), Grafičar Beograd (2019)–2020)
Petar Krstić – Radnički Pirot (2019–present)
Stevica Kuzmanovski – OFK Beograd (1984–1986, 1990–1991), Rad Beograd (1997–2000)
Nenad Lazarevski – RFK Novi Sad (2003–2006, 2011–2013), Radnički Sombor (2010–2011), FK Inđija (2013–2014)
Vlade Lazarevski – Napredak Kruševac (2001–2005), Temnić Varvarin (2016–present)
Aleksandar Lazevski – FK Teleoptik (2004–2007, 2008–2010), Vršac (2018-present)
Daniel Lempevski – Moravac Orion (2014–2015)
Borče Manevski – Banat Zrenjanin (2008–2010)
Žan Manovski – Srem S.Mitrovica (2011–2012)
Boban Marić – Hajduk Beograd (2006–2008)
Zoran Martinovski – GSP Polet Beograd (1997–1998)
Dančo Masev – Rad Beograd (2003–2004)
Darko Micevski – FK Sevojno (2009–2010)
Mitovski – Sinđelić Beograd (1997–1998)
Kliment Nastovski – Dinamo Vranje (2006–2007)
Filip Naumčevski – OFK Mladenovac (2011–2012)
Pavel Nedelkovski – Radnički Niš (2003–2004)
Matej Nikolov – Zlatibor Čajetina (2020–present)
Boban Nikolovski – FK Bor (1995–1996, 2003–2004), Železničar Beograd (1999–2000, 2001–2002), Srem S.Mitrovica (2002–2003), Hajduk Beograd (2003)–2004), Radnički Niš (2004–200_)
Dragi Pavlov – Radnički Pirot (199_–1998)
Milovan Petrovikj - Zlatibor Čajetina (2021-present)
 Petrovski – FK Bor (1993–1996)
Bojan Petrovski – Radnički Niš (2006–2007)
Borče Postolov – Dinamo Vranje (2006–2007)
Predrag Ranđelović – FK Teleoptik (2008–2011)
Stevica Ristić – Mladost Luks (2002–2003), Temnić Varvarin (2017–present)
Dušan Savić – Dubočica Leskovac (–2002,2020–present)
Sazdov – Sloga Kraljevo (1997–1998)
Marko Simunovikj – FK Teleoptik (2018–present)
Stefan Spirovski – Borac Čačak (2009–2014)
Perica Stančeski – Hajduk Beograd (2003–2004), Mačva Šabac (2016–2017)
Ostoja Stjepanović – Dinamo Vranje (2006–2007)
Milan Stoilković – Hajduk Beograd (2009)–2010, 2011–2012, 2013–present)
Nikola Stojanov – Sloboda Užice (2016–2017)
Nikola Stojanović – BSK Bujanovac (2001–2005, 2017–2018), Dinamo Vranje (2005–2013, 2016–2017), Radnik Surdulica (2008)–2009, 2013–2016)
Filip Stojanovski – Radnički Pirot (2017–2018)
Milan Stojanovski – Proleter Zrenjanin (1993–1997)
Gjorgji Tanušev – Proleter Novi Sad (2012–2014), Kolubara Lazarevac (2014–2015)
Zoran Todorov – FK Zemun (2007–2008), FK Voždovac (2008–2009)
Aleksandar Todorovski – Radnički Beograd (2002–2005), Grafičar Beograd (2020–2022)
Milosh Tosheski – Zemun (2018–2020), Smederevo (2018–2020)
Nikola Tosheski – Proleter Novi Sad (2017–2019)
Lazar Vidić – Radnički Kragujevac (2009–2011), Mladi Radnik (2011)–2012), Dinamo Vranje (2017)–2018)

Macedonian internationals that played in Serbian second league clubs only during Yugoslav period:
 Toni Jakimovski – Radnički Kragujevac (1988–1989)

Poland 
Aleksander Čišič – Bežanija (2014–2015)

Portugal 
Miguel Barbosa – Sloboda Užice (2018–2019)
Tiago Carneiro – Sevojno (2005–2006)
Maki Faria - BASK Beograd (2020-2021)
Vuk Kovacevic – Bežanija (2013–2014)

Puerto Rico 
Andrés Cabrero – Teleoptik (2009–2010)

Romania 
Eugen Cîrstea – RFK Novi Sad (1998–1999)
Jozef Kezdi – Viktorija Vršac (1936–1937)
Marinel Pascu – Spartak Subotica (–2001, 2005–2006)
Paunescu – Grafičar Beograd (1939–1940)
Florin Pelecaci – Srem S.Mirovica (2006–2007)

Russia 

 Nikita Arshinov – Bežanija (2017–2018)
 Maksim Artemchuk – Proleter Novi Sad (2017–2018), Zlatibor Čajetina (2019-2020)
 Stefan Baronov – OFK Žarkovo (2018–2019)
 Leonid Bayer – BASK Beograd (1940–1942)
 Leonid Bobrizhnyiy – KAFK Kula (1934–1936)
 Ignat Deryavko – Bežanija (2017–2018)
 Yuri Gazzaev – Mačva Šabac (1990–1991)
 Stanislav Goldin – Borac Čačak (2020–present)
 Ilya Guchmazov - Grafičar Beograd (2019-2021)
 Andrei Guzienko – Bečej (1990–1992)
 Fedor Khudenko - Radnički Beograd (2022-present)
 Roman Korhovoy – Sinđelić Beograd (2019–present)
 Uchuk Kuldinov – Proleter Zrenjanin (1946–1949)
 Maksim Lada – Teleoptik (2017–2018). OFK Žarkovo (2021–present)
 Martvey Martinkevich – Kabel Novi Sad (2021–2022), Loznica (2022–present)
 Egor Mishura – Sloga Petrovac na Mlavi (2014–2015)
 Sergei Mokoida – Sinđelić Beograd (2017–2018)
 Kiril Pakhomov – OFK Žarkovo (2020–present)
 Danil Pechenkin – OFK Žarkovo (2019–present)
 Nikita Sudarikov – IMT Beograd (2021–2022)
 Igor Sveshnikov – Inđija (2016–2017)
 Daniil Timofeev – IMT Beograd (2021–present)
 Igor Vasiliev – Ruski SK (1924–1925)
 Rastislav Vasiliev – Ruski SK (1924–1925)
 Vladislav Vasilyev – Bežanija (2017–2018)
 Vladimir Vinogradov – Ruski SK (1924–1925)
 Sergei Vitvinskiy – Građanski Sr. Mitrovica (192_–192_), Vojvodina (1922–1924)
 Bogdan Zhbanov – Sloboda Užice (2017–2018)
 Arkadi Zhelnin - Jedinstvo Ub (2022–present)
 Aleksei Zolotarenko – ČSK Pivara (2017–2018)

Senegal 
 Bado (Badara Badji) – Inđija (2018–2019,2021-2022)
 Alioune Diakhate – Teleoptik (2012–2013)
 Mamadou Diarra – Bežanija (2009–2010)
 Mamadou Diatta - Javor Ivanjica (2021-2022)
 Cherif Diouf - Vršac (2022–present)
 Fallou Fall - Grafičar Beograd (2022–2023)
 Ibrahima Mame N'Diaye – Napredak Kruševac (2012–2017)
 Seydou Bocar Seck – Dinamo Vranje (2018–2020)

Sierra Leone 

Mustapha Bangura – Zemun (2016–2017)
Kelfala Marah - Čukarički (2003-2005)

Singapore 
Aleksandar Đurić – Sloga Kraljevo (1992–1993)
Fahrudin Mustafić – Novi Pazar (2000–2002)

Slovakia 
 Boris Durgala – Dolina Padina (2011–2012)
 Boris Sekulić – Zemun (2009–2010)
 Marko Turan – Bežanija (2016–2018)

Slovenia 
The players that have played for the Slovenian national team are in bold, the others have played since 1992.
Marko Božič – Rad Beograd (2007–2008)
Nino Dirnbek – Donji Srem (2015–2016)
Dejan Gerić – Radnik Surdulica (2013–2014)
Goražd Gorinšek – Železničar Lajkovac (2000–2001)
Josip Lukenda – Javor Ivanjica (2006–2007)
Vladimir Mandić – Železničar Pančevo (2020–2021)
Peđa Misimović – Sinđelić Beograd (2013–2014)
Žan Osredkar – Javor Ivanjica (2006–2007)
Vanja Panič – Grafičar Beograd (2020)–2021)
Milan Rakič – RFK Novi Sad (1998–2000, 2010–2011)
Marko Simeunovič – Napredak Kruševac (1990–1991)
Stefan Smiljanić – Jedinstvo Putevi (2014–2015)
Peter Stojanovič – Bežanija (2012–2013)

Suriname 
 Mitchell Donald - Grafičar Beograd (2022-present)

Sweden 
Robin Kačaniklić – Teleoptik (2011–2012)
Michell Miljević-Sachpekidis – Radnik Surdulica (2014–2015)

Switzerland 
 Milan Basrak – Zemun (2010–2011), Smederevo (2013)–2014, 2019–2020), Inđija (2013–(2014), Jagodina (2020–2021), Budućnost Dobanovci (2021–2022)
 Mihailo Bogicevic – Loznica (2019–2021)
 Nemanja Cvijanović – Dinamo Vranje (2018–2020)
 Svetlan Kosić – Loznica (2015–2016), Budućnost Dobanovci (2016–2017)
 Veselin Lakić – Jagodina (2016–2018)
 Srdjan Maksimović – Radnički Pirot (2006–2007), Sevojno (2007–2008)
 Stefan Marinković – Bačka Bačka Palanka (2015–2016)
 Milan Marjanovic – Metalac G.M. (2019–2020)
 Aleksandar Njeguš – Zlatibor Čajetina (2018–2021)
 Miloš Opačić - Rad Beograd (2022-present)
 Emil Osmanovic – Javor Ivanjica (2014–2015)
 Milorad Stajic - Grafičar Beograd (2021–present)
 Nikola Stevanović – Sloga Kraljevo (2012–2013)
 Miroslav Trajković – Moravac Orion (2014–2015)
 Yves Vladislav – Teleoptik (2016–2018), Sinđelić Beograd (2018–2019)

Tanzania 
 Leonard Chindongo – Radnički Pirot (2020–2021)
 Nassor Hamoud – OFK Žarkovo (2019–2020)
 Muhsini Malima – Grafičar Beograd (2019–2020)

Thailand 
 Olaxon A Tamba - Metalac G.M. (2022–present)

Uganda 
 Khalid Aucho – OFK Beograd (2016–2017)
 Timothy Batabaire – OFK Niš (2003–2005)
 Abdulwahid Iddi – Budućnost Dobanovci (2021–present)
 Vincent Kayizi – Srem S. Mitrovica (2008–2011), FK Novi Pazar (2010–(2011)
 Nestroy Kizito – Srem S. Mitrovica (2003–2005)
 Abraham Ndugwa - Budućnost Dobanovci (2021-present)
 Pius Obuya – Kabel Novi Sad (2021–2022), Radnički S. Mitrovica (2022–present)
 Lawrence Segawa – Srem S. Mitrovica (2009–2010)
 Phillip Ssozi – Srem S. Mitrovica (2003–2005)

Ukraine 
 Maksym Andrushchenko – Smederevo (2019–2020), Dubočica Leskovac (2020-2021)
 Taras Bondarenko – Metalac G.M. (2016–2018)
 Marko Devych – Zvezdara (2000–2002), Radnički Beograd (2003–2004), Voždovac (2004–2005, 2019–2020)
 Andriy Gordon – Sloboda Užice (2000–2002)
 Serhiy Gordon – Sloboda Užice (2000–2002)
 Yevhen Kovalenko – OFK Žarkovo (2018–2019)
 Yevhen Pavlov - Vršac (2022-present)
 Bohdan Sichkaruk – Napredak Kruševac (2015–2016)

United States 
 Vukasin Bulatovic - Metalac G.M. (2022-present)
Ilija Mitić – Bor (1963–1965)
George Pantelic – Zemun (2010–2013)
Peter Thomas – Bane Raška (2003–2008)
Nate Weiss – Metalac G.M. (2008–2009)

Uzbekistan 
Nazimov – Jadran Beograd (192x–193x)

Venezuela 
Alejandro Pol Hurtado – Srem S.Mitrovica (2010–2011)

Zimbabwe 
Tinotenda Chibharo – Sloboda Užice (2017–2018)
Ronald Tendai Chitiza – ČSK Pivara (2016–2017),  TSC Bačka Topola (2017–2018)
Mike Temwanjera – Javor Ivanjica (2003–2006)

This is a list of foreign players that have played, or play, in the Serbian Leagues; North/Vojvodina, Belgrade, East, West, Serbian Republic League, lower Subassociation Leagues

The criterium is the same as applied in the main list.

Abkhazia 
 Daur Chanba – Lokomotiva Beograd (201x–2018)

Albania 
 Arjan Beqaj – Liria Prizren (1992–1995)
 Mario Beqaris – FK Beograd (2014–2015)
 Edonis Dacaj – Radnički Zrenjanin (2017–present)
 Armend Dallku – Kosovo Vučitrn (1997–2002)
 Mehmet Dragusha – KF Beselidhja (199_–1994)
 Arbnor Fejzullahu – FK Trnovac (2010–2011)
 Besnik Hasi – Vlaznimi Đakovica (198_–1988), Dinamo Pančevo (1991–1992)
 Bekim Kastrati – Budućnost Peć (199_–199_)
 Blerim Krasniqi – FK Trnovac (200_–20__)
 Riza Lushta – FK Rudari Trepča (1932–1934)
 Dodë Tahiri – ASK Obilić Aranđelovac (1930s&1950s)
 Gjelbrim Taipi – BSK Bujanovac (200_–2010), FK Trnovac (2010–2011)
 Faton Xhemaili – Budućnost Popovac 2017–2018

Argentina 
Gustavo Marino – Car Konstantin (2006–200_)
Roberto Oreb – Omladinac Zemun (195_–195_)

Armenia 
Angelyan – Timok Zaječar (1924–1925)
Gari Charatsupyan – Palilulac Beograd (201_–201_)

Australia 
Vid Amidzic – BASK Beograd (2011–2013)
Stefan Cicmil – , IMT Beograd (2016–2017), Žarkovo (2017–2018)
Bobby Despotovski – Dinamo Pančevo (1989–1991)
Zoran Ilic – FK Jagodina (1993–1995)
Milan Ivanović – FK Crvenka (1978–1979)
Joey Jevtić – OFK Beograd (2019–2021)
Aleksandar Jovanovic – FK Palić (2008)–2009), FK Veternik (2008–(2009)
Jake Jovanovski – OFK Beograd (2019–present)
Angelo Kalamvokis - Radnicki Nova Pazova (2021)-2022), Hajduk Beška (2021-(2022)
Joshua Markovski – IMT Beograd (2016–2019)
Marko Milutinović – OFK Beograd (2017–2018)
Srećko Mitrović – Radnički Stobex (2009–2010)
Srećko Mitrović – Cement Beočin (2017)–2018), Radnički Sremska Mitrovica (2017–(2018)
David Ninkovic – Mladost Bački Jarak (2017–present)
Damir Prodanovic – Vujić Voda Valjevo (2009–2010)
Nemanja Sokolović – OFK Beograd (2018–2019), OFK Mladenovac (2019–present)
Stefan Stanojević – Radnički Stobex (2012)–2013), Železničar Lajkovac (2013–(2014), FK Loznica (2016–present)
Milan Zoric – Indeks Novi Sad (2010)–2011), Cement Beočin (2010–(2011)

Austria 
Goran Kartalija – FK Vrbas (1985–1988)
Ivan Kristo – Hajduk Beograd (200_–200_)
Stefan Milojević – Bežanija (2017–2019)

Azerbaijan 
David Samedov – BASK Beograd (2016–2017)
 Branimir Subašić – FK Sremčica (2001–2002)

Belgium 
 Akwasi Oduro – Radnički Kragujevac (2008–2009)

Bosnia and Herzegovina 
Very incomplete
Nebojša Arbutina – Dinamo Pančevo (2009–2010, 2011–2012, 2012–present), Dolina Padina (2010–2011)
Omer Arifović – Loznica (2017–present)
Osman Arifović – Loznica (2017–present)
Aleksandar Babić – Bečej (2017–present)
Njegoš Babić – Vršac (2016–2017), Grafičar Beograd (2017–present)
Denil Badzak - Dinamo Pancevo (2021–present)
Miloš Bajić – Radnički Beograd (2016–2017), IMT Beograd (2018–2019,2020–present)
Slaviša Bogdanović – Palić (2012–2013), Dorćol (2013–2014), Srem Jakovo (2014–2015), FK Smederevo (2017–present)
Marko Bogojević – Radnički Šid (2017–2018)
Filip Božić – Sloga Požega (2018–2019)
Milorad Cimirot – Jedinstvo Ub (2010–2012)
Marko Čubrilo – FK Teleoptik (2016–2018)
Čedomir Dakić – Sloga Temerin (2008–2010), Mladost Bački Jarak (2013–present)
Đurađ Dobrijević – FK Teleoptik (2012–2015), OFK Žarkovo (2015–2016)
Nemanja Doderović – Karađorđe Topola (2011–2012, 2013–2017), Šumadija Aranđelovac (2012–2013, 2017–present)
Borislav Erić – Mačva Bogatić (2019–present)
Mladen Galić – FK Sopot (2009–2010), Sloga Temerin (2010–2011), Banat Zrenjanin (2013–2014), OFK Odžaci (2016–2018)
Ivan Gluhović – Radnički Šid (2016–2017), FK Sopot (2017–2018)
Almir Gredić – Polimlje Prijepolje (1999–2000)
Goran Guja – FK Vršac (2010–2012)
Jovan Ilić – Grafičar Beograd (2017–2018), Brodarac (2018–2020)
Mladen Jezdić – Borac Bivolje (2009–2013), Jedinstvo Paraćin (2013–2014), Dinamo Vranje (2014–2015), Dunav Prahovo (2017–present)
Mladen Jovančić – Dinamo Pančevo (2017–present)
Petar Jovanović – Radnički Stobex (2001–2004), Sloboda Užice (2004–2005)
Darko Jović – ČSK Pivara (2017–present)
Nemanja Jović – Teleoptik (2019–2020)
Milorad Kosić – Sloga Temerin (2011)–2012), Mladi Radnik (2012–2013), Cement Beočin (2014–2015), Mladost Bački Jarak (2011–(2012), 2013–2014), 2015–present)
Stefan Kovač – IMT Novi Beograd (2017–2018)
Milan Lalić – Zemun (2012–2014), Radnički Nova Pazova (2015–2016, 2017–2018)
Milenko Malović – Srem Jakovo (2011–2012), BASK Beograd (2013–2014)
Slavko Marić – Hajduk Beograd (2001–2006)
Dragan-Vuk Marković – Radnički Beograd (2017–2018), OFK Beograd (2018–present)
Dragan Matković - Vršac (2020-2021)
Slobodan Milanović – FK Beograd (2010–2011)
Milan Mirić – Borac Čačak (2019–present)
Siniša Mladenović – Sloga Kraljevo (2008–2009, 2010–2014), Metalac Kraljevo (2009–2010)
Aleksa Mrđa – Lokomotiva Železnik (2018)–2019), BSK Borča (2019–present)
Momčilo Mrkaić – FK Zemun (2011–2013, 2018–2019)
Branko Ostojić – Sloboda Čačak (2002–2007), Radnički Kragujevac (2007–2008, 2018–2019), FAP Priboj (2008–2010), Partizan Bumbarevo Brdo (2010–2011), Borac Čačak (2019–present)
Danijel Panić – RFK Novi Sad (2013)–2014), Sloga Temerin (2013–2017), Mladost Bački Jarak (2017–present)
Đorđe Pantelić – Kabel Novi Sad (2018–present)
Stefan Paranos – Crvena zvezda Mali Mokri Lug (2016–2017), BSK Batajnica (2017)–2018), BASK Beograd (2017–present)
Milovan Petrić – OFK Vršac (2018)–2019)
Todor Petrović – FK Zemun (2011–2012), FK Sopot (2012–2014)
Bojan Popović – Srem Jakovo (2010–2011), FK Beograd (2011–2012)
Kristijan Radinovic - OFK Beograd (2020-2022)
Branislav Ružić – Loznica (2011–2012, 2019–present)
Stefan Santrač – Grafičar Beograd (2018–present)
Željko Savić – Omladinac Novi Banovci (2006–2012, 2019–present)
Filip Sredojević – FK Smederevo (2015–2016), Grafičar Beograd (2016–present)
Đorđe Stanković – Sinđelić Niš (2019–present)
Nemanja Stjepanović – Big Bull Bačinci (2004–2005)
Ognjen Stjepanović – Brodarac (2016–2017)
Ognjen Šinik – Radnik Stari Tamiš (2004–2008), Sinđelić Beograd (2008–2009), FK Beograd (2009–2010), Dolina Padina (2014)–2015), Radnički Sombor (2014–(2015), OFK Beograd (2017–present)
Branislav Terzić – BASK Beograd (2011–2012), FK Zemun (2012–2013, 2018–present)
Zoran Vasiljević – Radnički Sombor (199_–199_), Cement Beočin (199_–)
Nemanja Vejnović – Jedinstvo Ub (2010–2012)
Predrag Vladić – Kabel Novi Sad (2018–present)
Filip Vujović – FK Žarkovo (2016–present)
Stefan Vukadin – OFK Žarkovo (2013–2014), IM Rakovica (2014–2015), FK Teleoptik (2015–2017)
Goran Vukliš – Radniĉki Nova Pazova (2006–2007), FK Zemun (2008–2009)
 Dejan Vukomanović – Palilulac Beograd (2006–2011), BSK Borča (2011–2012, 2019–2020)

Brazil
Adriano – Zmaj Zemun (2007–2008)
Alex – FK Teleoptik (2008–2010)
Edison Amaral – Remont Čačak (2000–2001)
Anderson Costa – Dinamo Pančevo (2002–2004)
Elton Martins – FK Teleoptik (2008–2009)
Fabio Silva - Hajduk Beograd (2020–present)
Jefferson Madeira – FK Teleoptik (2008–2009)
Moisés – Sinđelić Niš (2008–2009)
Renan Eduardo – Sinđelić Niš (2008–2009)
Wagner – Zmaj Zemun (2007–2008)
Washington Santana – FK Teleoptik (2008–2010)
William Alves – Slavija Novi Sad (2008–2009)

Brunei 
Arsen Marjan – PKB Padinska Skela (199_–1998), Palilulac Beograd (2010–2011)

Bulgaria
Georgi Bogdanov – Morava Ćuprija (1990–1991)
Ivan Čvorović – FK Teleoptik (2002–2003), Srem Jakovo (2003–2005)
Tsvetko Ivanov – FK Jagodina (1990–1991)
Karakashanov – Ozren Sokobanja (1963–1964)
Hari Kazakov – Timok Zaječar (199_–199_)
Yordan Kostov – Timok Zaječar (1990–1991)
Bev Lulin – Radnički Svilajnac (1990–1991)
Kiril Petrov – Radnički Svilajnac (1990–1991)
Dimitar Petrunov – Jedinstvo Platičevo (2003–2008), Jedinstvo Pirot (201_–2015)
 Sokolov – FK Bor (1987–1989, 1997–2000)
Metodi Tomanov – Timok Zaječar (1990–1991)
Zlatomir Zagorčić – Grafičar Beograd (2006–2009)
Nikolay Zoykov – Morava Ćuprija (1990–1991)

Burkina Faso 
Issouf Compaoré – Fruškogorac (2008–2009)

Cameroon 
 Theophile Abanda - Loznica (2006-2007), Vujić Voda Valjevo (2007-2008), Jedinstvo Ub (2008-2009)
 Thierry Ako – Spartak Subotica (2003–2005, 2007–2008), Bečej (2005–2007)
 Vincent Ngongang – BSK Batajnica (2001–2004), Teleoptik (2004–2006), Proleter Novi Sad (2006–2009), Metalac Futog (2009–2012), Borac Kruševac (2012–2014), Crvenka (2014–2017)
 Claude Rygan – Teleoptik (2003–2004)

Canada 
Milan Beader – Omladinac Novi Banovci (2016–2017)
Milan Božić – Železničar Beograd (2007)–2008), Kolubara Lazarevac (2007–(2008), FK Beograd (2009–2010), FK Bulbuderac (2012–2013), FK Zvezdara (2013–2015)
Srdjan Djekanović – Zmaj Zemun (2001–2002), Železničar Beograd (2003–2004)
Tibor Gemeri – FK Crvenka (1974–1975)
Milan Janikic – Lokomotiva Beograd (2008–2012) 
Boban Kajgo – Hajduk Beograd (2007–2009, 2009–2011), Balkan Bukovica (2012–2013)
Misel Klisara – Spektrum Novi Sad (2006)–2007)
Olivier Lacoste-Lebuis – Mladi Radnik Bačina (2000–2002)
Jovan Lučić – Hajduk Beograd (2014–2015), BSK Batajnica (2015)–2016), FK Vršac (2015–(2016), Radnički Beograd (2016–2018). FK Zvezdara (2018–2019)
Aleksa Marković – Radnički Beograd (2016)–2017), FK Brodarac (2016–(2017)
Igor Prostran – FK Beograd (200x–2001)
Mike Stojanovic – Morava Velika Plana (1966–1969)

China 
Gao Feng – FK Beograd (2006–2007)
Li Xin – Zvižd Kučevo (2007–2008)
Wan Houliang – ČSK Pivara (2002–2004)
Xu Yang – FK Beograd (2006–2007)
Zeyi Feng - Kabel Novi Sad (2020-2021)
Zhao Pu – Zvižd Kučevo (2007–2008)

Côte d'Ivoire 
Rudolph Diezion – FK Gučevo (2007–2009)
Arnaud Gaibo – FK Gučevo (2008–2009)
Marcel Metoua – FK Fruškogorac (2007–2008)
Simlice Ouhomblegnon – FK Gučevo (2008–2009)

Croatia 
The players that have played for the Croatian National Team are in bold, the others have played since 1992.
Predrag Alić – Budućnost Gložan (2014–present)
Vedran Bjelajac – Proleter Zrenjanin (2003–2006), Begej Žitište (2006–2007), Crvena zvezda Vojvode Stepe (2007–2008), Spartak Debeljača (2008)–2009), Metalac Futog (2008–2010), KMF SAS Zrenjanin (2010–2011), FK Veternik (2011–2012), Cement Beočin (2012–present)
Dean Borović – Radnički Beograd (2007–2008), Balkan Bukovica (2008–2012)
Matteo Brdar – Dunav Stari Banovci (2013–2014), Jedinstvo Stara Pazova (2015)–2016), Sremac Vojka (2015–present)
Ivan Budinčević – Obilić Novi Kneževac (1991–199_), Radnički Bajmok (199_–199_), Zorka Subotica (199_–199_), FK Aleksa Šantić (199_–2000)
Dražen Cvjetković – Tekstilac Odžaci (1998–1999), FK Crvenka (1999–2000, 2006–2007, 20__–2014), FK Inđija (2000–2001), Spartak Subotica (2001–2007), FK Vršac, FK Bajmok
Armando Čekić – Sloboda Novi Kozarci (2009–201_), FK Palić (201_–2014), OFK Kikinda (2014–2015), ŽAK Kikinda (2015–present)
Dejan Čugalj – FK Srbobran (2014–2016)
Zoran Čugalj – Radnički Šid (2001–2002)
Dragan Dobrić – BSK Borča (2004–2005), Palilulac Beograd (2005–2010), Srem Jakovo (2010–2011), FK Resnik (2011–2012), PKB Padinska Skela (2012–present)
Dražen Dobrić – Šumadinac Stojnik (2007–2009), Posavac Tišma (2009–2010), Borac Progar (2010–2011), Srem Jakovo (2011–present)
Branislav Drobnjak – Borac Martinci (2004–2006), FK Big Bul (2009–2010), Radnički Šid (2010–2011, 2012–present)
Stevica Dujaković – BSK Borča (2004–2005)
Duško Dukić – Jedinstvo Paraćin (2004–2006, 2019–present), Borac Paraćin (2018–2019)
Svetozar Džanić – Slavija Novi Sad (193x–1934)
Dejan Godar – FK Tavankut (199_–199_), Solunac Karađorđevo (199_–199_)
Boris Gospojević – Borac Novi Sad (2007–2008), Radnički Šid (2008–2011, 2011–present), Proleter Novi Sad (2010–(2011)
Nebojša Ivančević – Radnički Nova Pazova (2014–2016)
Goran Ivanišević – Omladinac Novi Banovci (2009–2011), Dunav Stari Banovci (2011–present)
Radovan Ivković – Krila Krajina Bačka Palanka (2006–2007), OFK Futog (2007–2008), Bačka Bačka Palanka (2008–2010, 2012–present), ČSK Pivara (2010–2011, 2018–present), Hajduk Kula (2018)–2019)
Srđan Ivković – Radnički Šid (2012–2014, 2014–present)
Nemanja Jorgić – Sloga Temerin (2006–2008, 2011–2014), FK Palić (2008–2010), Radnički Sombor (2013–2014), Cement Beočin (2014)–2015), TSC Bačka Topola (2014–present)
Slaven Juriša – Dinamo Pančevo (2012–2016)
Ilija Knezić – FK Big Bull (2007–2010), FK Resnik (2009)–2010), FK Žarkovo (2011–present)
Ivan Konjević – FK Teleoptik (199_–199_)
Dario Krivokuća – Jedinstvo Stara Pazova (2015–present)
Petar Krneta – Radnički Šid (2011–2012)
Zoran Kukić – Radnički Šid (1999–2000)
Slaven Lakić – Radnički Sombor (2001–2006, 2009–present)
Denis Lazinica – FK Palić (2009–2011), Radnički Bajmok (2011–2012), FK Bačka 1901 (2012–2015)
Marko Lepinjica – Radnički Šid (2013–present)
Boženko Lešina – Zmaj Zemun (2005–2008)
Davor Magoč – Šajkaš Kovilj (2004)–2005), ČSK Pivara (2004–2008, 2009–2010), Stražilovo Sr. Karlovci (2010–2011), Crvena zvezda Novi Sad (2011–2012)
Slavko Mandić – FK Bačka 1901 (199_–199_)
Aleksandar Manojlović – Jedinstvo Stara Pazova (2011–present)
Dušan Martić – Tekstilac Odžaci (2011–2013)
Jovica Mikić – Zmaj Zemun (2007–2009), Fruškogorac Kukujevci (2012–2014), Radnički Šid (2014–present)
Boris Miljković –  FK Car Konstantin (2010–present)
Bojan Milovanović – RFK Novi Sad (20__–20__)
Todor Mizdrak – Mladi Obilić (2003–2005), Železničar Beograd (2005–2006, 2008–2010), Balkan Bukovica (2009–(2010), FK Žarkovo (2012–2013), FK Brodarac (2014–present)
Marko Moravčić – FK Bačka 1901 (2003–2004), Zlatibor Voda Horgoš (2006–2007), Spartak Subotica (2007–2008)
Miroslav Pavlović – ČSK Pivara (2001–2004, 2004–2011, 2013–present), Budućnost Gložan (2012–2013)
Predrag Počuča – FK Dorćol (2004)–2005), FK Žarkovo (2004–(2005)
Dejan Poljaković – FK Bačka 1901 (1993–199_)
Mario Pufek – Spartak Subotica (200_–2004), FK Bačka 1901 (2014–2015)
Tomislav Pukšec – Topličanin Prokuplje
Ognjen Pupovac – FK Obilić (201_–2015)
Uroš Puskas – Radnički Šid (2015–present)
Obrad Ratković – FK Vršac (2008–2014)
Nikola Rudnicki – Banat Zrenjanin (2009–2010, (2013)–2014), Vojvodina Novo Miloševo (2010)–2011), Zadrugar Lazarevo (2011–2012), Budućnost Srpska Crnja (2012–2013), Jedinstvo Novi Bečej (2013–(2014), Jedinstvo Banatsko Karađorđevo (2014–2015), Begej Žitište (2015–present)
Kujtim Shala – Liria Prizren (1981–1983)
Aleksandar Špehar – Bratstvo Prigrevica (2015–present)
Zoran Stamenić – ČSK Pivara (1998–2004, 2004–2006)
Nemanja Tomić – Mladi Radnik (2012–present)
Dragan Trešnjić – Spartak Subotica (2003–2005)
Damir Vitas – Radnički Bajmok (2002–2003)
Mile Vujasin – Cement Beočin (2012–2013), Dunav Stari Banovci (2013)–2014), Radnički Nova Pazova (2013–(2014), 2014–2016), Ozren Sokobanja (2014)–2015)

Cyprus 
Alexander Špoljarić – Hajduk Beograd (2016–2017), Grafičar Beograd (2017–2018)

Czech Republic 
 Jozef Boucek aka Josip Buček – Deligrad Aleksinac (1909)
 Richard Jakubec – Palilulac Beograd (197_–19__)
 Janiček – ĐSK Inđija (193_–1941)
 Alois Machek – FK Šumadija 1903 (191_–191_), Morava Ćuprija (1918), Soko Beograd (1927–192_)
 Eduard Mifek – FK Šumadija 1903 (191_–191_), Morava Ćuprija (1918)
 Venčel Petrovický – FK Šumadija 1903 (191_–191_)
 Jozef Urlah – Mladost Bački Petrovac (1990–1991)
 Juraj Varga – Mladost Bački Petrovac (1990–1991)
 Rudolf Vitner – Bačka Bačka Palanka (194_–195_)
 Batko Voves – Srbobran

Denmark 
Michael Hansen Schon – Bačka Bačka Palanka (2009–2010)

Dominican Republic 
Eduardo Acevedo – FK Crvenka (2008–2009), FK Veternik (2009–2010)
Kerbi Rodríguez – FK Crvenka (2008–2009), FK Veternik (2009–2010)

Egypt 
Karim Marei – FK Obilić (2009–2010)

El Salvador 
Vladan Vicevic – Sloboda Užice (1986–1992, 1999–2002)

England 
Nicholas Tonic – Car Konstantin (2013–present)

France 
 Comisser – FK Bor (1920–19__)
 Galoa – FK Bor (1920–19__)
 Gisse – FK Bor (1920–19__)
 Jean – BSK Vitez Bor (1924–1925)
 Goran Jerković – Prva Iskra Barić (2021–present)
 Marcel – BSK Vitez Bor (1924–1925)
David Marinković – Banat Zrenjanin (2012–2015), Radnički Zrenjanin (2016–present)
David Milinković – BASK Beograd (2012–2015)
Stephen Milosavljević – Bane Raška (2011–2012)
 Morran – FK Bor (1920–19__)
 Prinne – FK Bor (1920–19__)
 Talle – FK Bor (1920–19__)

Georgia 
Akaki Tskarozia – Sinđelić Beograd (2007–2008)

Germany
Andrej Bencke - Kabel Novi Sad (2022-present)
Milan Delevic – Zvezdara (2018–2020)
Aleksandar Dugonjić – Cement Beočin (2015–2016), Sloga Temerin (2016–present)
Aleksandar Erak – Sloga Temerin (2013–2016), Bratstvo Prigrevica (2016)–2017, 2019–present), TSC Bačka Topola (2016–2019), Hajduk Kula (2019)–2020), RFK Novi Sad (2021-present
Zarije Gojkovic – Mladost Bački Jarak (2017–present)
Stefan Jovanović – FK Zemun (2012–2013), Radnički Obrenovac (2013–2014), Srem Jakovo (2014–2016), FK Dorćol (2016–2017), OFK Beograd (2017–present)
Viktor Jung – Viktorija Vršac (1924–1925)
Arsenije Klisurić – Kolubara Lazarevac, FK Teleoptik, Sloga Kraljevo (2006–2008)
Stefan Kukoljac – Crvena zvezda Mali Mokri Lug (2015–2016, 2018–2019), BASK Beograd (2017–2018), OFK Beograd (2019–present)
Uroš Milovanović – OFK Beograd (2016–present)
Robert Puha – FK Bačka 1901 (1990–1991)
Srđan Stevanović – Grafičar Beograd (2005–2006)
Nikola Vukasinovic – OFK Kula (2012–2014), Ozren Sokobanja (2014–2015), Hajduk Kula (2015–present)

Ghana 
Melvin Banda – OFK Šapine (2015–2016)

Greece 
 Theodoros Apostolidis – Mladost Bor (1970)–1971)
 Artas Charaiskakis - OFK Beograd (2022-present)
 Janko Jovanovic – Šumadija Kragujevac (2017–present)
 Christoforos Margaritis – Indeks Novi Sad (2006–2008), FK Dorćol (2008–2009)
 Marko Stojanov – Železničar Pančevo (201_–2018), Dinamo Pančevo (2018–present)
 Dimitris Tsinovits – IMT Beograd (2018–2020)
 Michalis Zistakis – Konkordija Beograd (19__–1924), Trgovački Beograd (1929–1930)

Guinea 
Fodé Cisse – Sinđelić Niš (2004–2006), FK Dorćol (2006–2007), Sinđelić Beograd (2007–2008)

Honduras 
Manuel Ancheta – FK Bačka Topola (2011–2012)

Hungary 
Gyula Blau – UTK Novi Sad (19__–1913)
Tamás Boros – TSC Bačka Topola (2013–2016)
Predrag Bošnjak – FK Bačka 1901 (2002–2004), FK Veternik (2004–2006), OFK Kikinda (2008–2009)
Toni Buják – Radnički Sombor (20__–2013), Partizan Kupusina (2013–(2014)
Hampar Cumjan Garabet – Grafičar Beograd (2007–2008)
Ivan Glavnik – Metalac Bor (1944–1945), FK Bor (1945–1946)
Jószef Hornok – Bačka Subotica (1945–1949)
Lajos Horváth – Građanski Sr. Mitrovica (1919–1920s)
István Juhász – FK Bačka 1901
Jenő Kalmár – Eđšeg Bačka Topola (1946–1948)
Zsombor Kerekes – AFK Ada (198_–1990)
János Keresztes – Bunjevac Subotica (193_–1938), Bohemija Subotica (1938–19xx)
Norbert Könyves – FK Bačka Topola (2007–2008)
József Kőszegi – FK Bačka Mol (1920s)
Sándor Kőszegi – FK Bačka Mol (1920s)
László Köteles – Grafičar Beograd (2003–2005)
Sándor Kovács – FK Senta (199_–199_)
Károly Kovacsics – Zlatibor Voda Horgoš (2007–2008)
József Lakatos – Jugoslavija Jabuka (1937–1938), Radnički Kragujevac (1945–1946)
Robert Mak – Spartak Debeljača (2007–2011, 2013–2015), Dolina Padina (2011–2012)
Ferenc Makó – Bulbuderac (1952–195_)
Tamás Mező – OFK Niš (1997–1998)
Sándor Mihalecz – FK Senta (2009–2010)
László Némedi – FK Bor (1959–1963)
Károly Nemes – NAK Novi Sad (1919–1924)
Nemanja Nikolić – FK Senta (200_–2006)
István Nyers – ŽAK Subotica (1941–1945)
György Oláh – FK Bačka Mol (192_–1931, 1943–1947, 1950–195_), FK Senta (1934–1937), Jugoslavija Jabuka (1937–19__) – played for Hungary B
Lajos Pál – FK Omladinac Bor (1937–19__)
Zsolt Radics – FK Horgoš (199_–199_), Graničar Jamena (–2001), FK Senta (2005–2006)
László Rozgonyi – Radnički Pirot (2007–2008), Dinamo Pančevo (200_–200_)
David Sinkovics – TSC Bačka Topola (2016–present)
Tibor Szabó – FK Teleoptik (199_–199_), Cement Beočin (1996–1997)
Toni Szabó – PSK Pančevo (1924–192_)
Tojaš – UTK Novi Sad (1920)
József Urda – FK Bačka Mol (1940s)
Stefan Vladul – Dinamo Pančevo (20__–20__), Dolina Padina (2011–2012)
István Vörös – RFK Novi Sad (1961–1962)

Iceland 
Zlatko Krickic – Polet Ljubić (2013–2014)
Đorđe Panić – Grafičar Beograd (2017–2018)

Italy 
Stefano Andreata – Inđija (2012–2015),  Jedinstvo Stara Pazova (2015–2018)
Arnoldo Balduini – Metalac Bor (1955–1961)
Mirko Benin – Inđija (2007–2008)
Augusto Della Pietra – Jedinstvo Zaječar (193_–1937), Građanski Ćuprija (1937–193_)
Franceschi – Sloga Kraljevo (1961–1962)
Lino Gazapi – Sloboda Užice (1947)
Stefano Guidici – Bačka Subotica (1945–1947)
Lorenzo Luciano – Kabel Novi Sad (2017–2018), Homoljac Žagubica (2020–present)
Mario – Maksim Divnić Zemun (1945)
Stefano Pignatelli – Palilulac Beograd, (196_–196_), FK Jugopeptrol (196_–1967), Čukarički (1967–1969)

Japan 
Masafumi Takatsuka – IMT Beograd

Kazakhstan 
Nenad Erić – Sloga Požega (1999–2002)

Korea D.P.R. 

An Il-bom – Radnički Kragujevac (2009–2010)
Myong Cha-hyon – Radnički Kragujevac (2009–2010)
Ri Kwang-il – Radnički Kragujevac (2009)–2010), Erdoglija Kragujevac (2009–(2010)

Korea (South) 
Jeo Won-dang – Teleoptik (2004–2005)
Lin Chan-jang - Radnicki Nova Pazova (201x-2017)
Uh Jun-yong - Mladost Apatin (2010-2011)

Kosovo 
Safet Abazaj – Jedinstvo Novi Bečej (1989–1993)
Edin Ahmeti – Trstenik PPT, Palilulac Beograd (2006–present)
Filip Berisha – FK Zvezdara (2016–2018, 2019–present), BSK Borča (2018)–2019)
Ernes Dalifi – Hajduk Beograd (2012–2014), BASK Beograd (2014–present), Radnički Beograd (2015–(2016)
Eldin Djemaj – Dunav Stari Banovci (2013–2015)
Bujamim Dzemaili – Dinamo Vranje (2014–2015)
Muhamed Ilazi – Sloga Leskovac (2006–2008), Moravac Predejane (2012–present)
Besnik Krasniqi – FK Trnovac (2014–2015)
Lapidar Lladrovci – FK 14. Oktobar (2011–2013)
Enes Maliqi – Borac Ostružnica (201_–2014)
Husein Nazifi – Jastrebac Proleter (2006–2008)
Stefan Shala – Sloga Despotovac (2016)–2017), Borac Paraćin (2016–present)
Nexhat Sulejmani – Železničar Beograd (1998–1999)
Jetmir Topalli – FK Trnovac (2015–2017)
Iljasa Zulfiu – FK Pukovac (2016–2017), Ozren Sokobanja (2017–2018)

Libya 
 Majid Mahdi – Donji Srem (2015–2017)

Lithuania 
 Peter Jesaulenko – Ruski SK (1924–192x)

Malta
 Neil Frendo – OFK Beograd (2018–2019)
 Zachary Grech – OFK Beograd (2018–2019)
 Mattia Veselji – OFK Beograd (2018–2019,2020–2021)

Moldova 
 Dmitrie Moşneagă – Sloga Petrovac na Mlavi (2006–2010)
 Igor Tiunikov – Železničar Niš (2007–20xx)

Montenegro 
 Bojan Adžić - Brodarac (2021)-2022)
 Radovan Banjević – Crvena zvezda Novi Sad (2018–2019), Bačka Subotica (2019–present)
 Darko Bošković – OFK Odžaci (2017–present)
 Vladimir Božović – Šumadija Kragujevac (2016–present)
 Marko Brnović - Teleoptik (2021-2022)
 Drago Bumbar – Grafičar Beograd (2016–2018)
 Pavle Čujović – IMT Novi Beograd (2018)–2019), Stepojevac Vaga (2018–present)
 Stefan Dabetić – Šumadija Jagnjilo (2009–2011), FK Voždovac (2011–2013), IM Rakovica (2013)–2014), FK Sopot (2013–2014, 2015–2017), Radnički Beograd (2015)–2016), FK Dorćol (2016)–2017, 2017–present)
 Marko Despotović – Jedinstvo Ub (2012–2015), Radnički Obrenovac (2014–(2015), Omladinac Novi Banovci (2015–2016), Dunav Stari Banovci (2016–2018)
 Mirko Drašković – BASK Beograd (2017–present)
 Jovan Drobnjak – FK Beograd (2010–2011)
 Lazar Đokić – Radnički Beograd (2015–(2016)
 Vuk Đurić – Sloboda Užice (2005–2007, (2011)–2012, 2015–2016), FK Voždovac (2011–2013), Sinđelić Beograd (2012–(2013), Sloga Bajina Bašta (2016–2017)
 Nikola Glavičanin – Pobeda Beloševac (2012–2014), OFK Mladenovac (2013–(2014), Zvezdara (2014–2016), Vršac (2016–2017), Crvena zvezda Novi Sad (2017–2019), Hajduk Kula (2019–present)
 Tigran Goranović – Grafičar Beograd (2016–2017), Radnički Beograd (2017–2018), IMT Novi Beograd (2018–2010)
 Boško Guzina – FK Žarkovo (2015–2017)
 Milovan Ilić – Radnički Pirot (2018–2019), Topličanin Prokuplje (2019–present)
 Stefan Knežević – Brodarac Beograd (2018–2019), Radnički Obrenovac (2019–present)
 Veselin Kosović – Železničar Pančevo (2016–2017), Proleter Vranovo (2017–present)
 Nikola Krstinić – Banat Zrenjanin (2009–2011, 2013–2016), Zadrugar Lazarevo (2011–2012), Dolina Padina (2015–(2016), Radnički Zrenjanin (2016–present)
 Stefan Mihajlović – Crvena zvezda Novi Sad (2016–2017), Mladost Bački Jarak (2017–2018)
 Nemanja Mijušković – Jedinstvo Ub (2009–2010)
 Petar Milivojević – Radnički Obrenovac (2016–present)
 Sava Mugoša – FK Vršac (2016)–2017), BSK Batajnica (2016–(2017), Dinamo Pančevo (2017)–2018), FK Tutin (2017–present)
 Nedžad Nezirović – FK Tutin (2017–present)
 Baćo Nikolić – Drina Ljubovija (2018–2019), Timočanin Knjaževac (2019–present)
 Nemanja Ostojić – FK Palić (2013–2014), FK Teleoptik (2014–2015), Hajduk Beograd (2015–2016)
 Vasilije Perović – Ozren Sokobanja (2017–present)
 Andrej Pupović – Železničar Pančevo (2019–present)
 Stefan Račković – Zvižd Kučevo (2015)–2016), BASK Beograd (2016)–2017), Stepojevac Vaga (2017)–2018), Proleter Vranovo (2017–present)
 Vasilije Radenović – Kolubara Lazarevac (2013–2016), Brodarac Beograd (2019)–2020)
 Aleksandar Radović – Kolubara Lazarevac (2003–2004, 2006–2007), FK Bečej (2005)–2006, (2006)–2007), FK Sopot (2005–2006), Hajduk Beograd (2007–2008),  Borac Sakule (2015–2016)
 Marko Rakonjac – IMT Beograd (2019–2020)
 Peđa Savić – Teleoptik (2015–present)
 Marko Stanovčić – Sinđelić Beograd (2008–2009), FK Zemun (2012–2013), FK Sopot (2016–2017), GSP Polet Dorćol (2017–present)
 Nikola Sipcic - OFK Zarkovo (2014-2016)
 Bojan Šljivančanin – Teleoptik (2006–2008)
 Filip Vorotović – Teleoptik (2016–2017, 2018–present)
 Aleksandar Vujačić – FK Zemun (2008–2009)
 Nikola Vujnović – Radnički Obrenovac (2012–2014)
 Predrag Vujović – Trayal Kruševac (2016–2018), Jedinstvo Paraćin (2018–present)
 Nikola Vukčević – Lokomotiva Beograd (2017–present)

Netherlands 
 Suleiman Jalu - OFK Beograd (2019-2020)

Nigeria 
Victor Agbo – Grafičar Beograd (2004–2005), Sloga Kraljevo (2007–2008), Šumadija Aranđelovac (2008–2009), Rudar Kostolac (2009–2011), Šećeranac Beograd (2012)–2013), Hajduk Veljko (2012–201x)
Nnaemeka Ajuru – Metalac G.M. (2005–2006)
Amuda Alabi – Železničar Novi Sad (19__–19__) Note: before 1996
Franklin Ayodele – Loznica (2008–2009)
Casey - Jedinstvo Ub (2006-2007)
Eleanya Kelechi Collins – Tekstilac Ites (2003–2004), Bane Raška (2004–2005)
Ezeh Chinedu – Kosanica (2004–2008), Jedinstvo Ub (2007–(2008)
Ifeanyi Emeghara – Teleoptik (2003–2004)
Mark Geff – Tutin (2004–2006), Bačka Bačka Palanka (2005–2006), Jedinstvo Ub (2006–2007), Komgrap Beograd (2007–2008), Mladi Obilić (2008–2009), FK Dorćol (2009–2010)
Anthony Agha Ibiam – ŽAK Kikinda (2008)–2009), Radnički Nova Pazova (2008–(2009), Balkanski Dimitrovgrad (2009–2010)
Ifeanyi Igbodo – Banja Beograd (2004–2007)
John Igbodo – Bor (2020–present)
Charming Temiloluwa Imabeh – BASK Beograd (2015–2016)
Victor Jideonwor – Dragačevo Guča (2005–2007), Lokomotiva Beograd (2007–2008)
Oladipupo Martins – Teleoptik (2003–2005, 2006–2007)
Samuel Nnamani – OFK Tabane (2014–2015)
Obiora Odita – FK Vučje (2002–2003)
Obele Okeke Onyebuchi – OFK Mladenovac (2003–2004), FK Ljubija (2008–(2009)
Henry Okoro – Budućnost Valjevo (2003–2004)
Reuben Okoro – Mačva Šabac (2014–2016)
Sunday Patrick Okoro – Radnički Pirot (2008–2010)
Solomon Oladele – Sinđelić Niš (2009–2010)
Celestine Olisa – Polimlje Prijepolje (200_–200_)
Ifeanyi Victor Onyilo – Sloga Požega (2008–2009)
Peter Taiye Oladotun – Radnički Beograd (2006–2007), PKB Padinska Skela (2008–2009), Radnički Kragujevac (2009–2010)
Raphael Remigus Governor - OFK Kikinda (202_-present)
Aminu Sani - Radnički Kragujevac (2008-2009)
Okomayin Segun Onimisi - Dubočica Leskovac (2020-2022)
Sodiq Suraj - Teleoptik (2008-2009)
Amaechi Nwabunwane Tochukwu – Dinamo Pančevo (2007–2008)

North Macedonia 
The players that have played for the Macedonian National Team are in bold, the others have played since 1992.
Milan Aleksić – Dinamo Vranje (201_–2015)
Darko Aleksovski – Lokomotiva Beograd (200_–201_)
Vebi Alievski – FK 1. Maj Agroruma (2010–2012)
Aleksa Amanović – FK Teleoptik (2014–2015), IMT Beograd (2015–2016)
Stefan Andrić – Radnički Kragujevac (2014–2016), Šumadija Kragujevac (2016–2017)
Ljupče Arsovski – Topličanin Prokuplje
Boban Avramovski – Turbina Vreoci (2008–present)
Sava Avramovski – OFK Beograd (2018–2020)
Albert Bajrami – FK Bačka 1901 (2013–present)
Arbën Biboski – Jedinstvo Smederevo (2006–2008)
Omer Biševac – Big Bul Bačinci (2008–2009)
Vlado Blazeski – Sloga Kraljevo (2001–2005)
Nikola Bogdanovski – FK Teleoptik (2016–2017), Radnički Beograd (2017–2018)
Bojan Bogojevski – Šumadija Jagnjilo (2007–2009), Palilulac Beograd (2010–present)
Dragan Čadikovski – Kolubara Lazarevac (1997–2001, 2014–2015, 2016–2019), TEK Sloga Veliki Crljeni (2019–present)
Ivica Cvetanovski – Sloboda Užice (1989–1993, 1993–1996)
Milan Cvetanovski – FK Voždovac (2001–2003), BPI Pekar (2003–2004), Železničar Beograd (2004–2005), Grafičar Beograd (2007–2008)
Olivio Dautovski – Topličanin Prokuplje (1989–1995)
Igor Denkić – Železničar Niš (200_–200_), Car Konstantin (200_–present)
Lazar Djorejlievski – FK Dorćol (2016–2017), IMT Beograd (2017–present)
Boris Dobrić – Šumadija Kragujevac (201_–2018), Radnički Svilajnac (2018–present)
Mario Đurovski – OFK Mladenovac (2003)–2004), FK Sopot (2003–(2004)
Milko Đurovski – Čukarički Stankom (1979–1980)
Argjent Gafuri – FK Jošanica (200_–200_)
 Georgijevski – Rudar Bor (1989–1993)
Sašo Gjoreski – Radnički Sombor (–)
Darko Grozdanoski –  BASK Beograd (2015–2017), Žarkovo (2017)–2018), Prva Iskra Barić (2017–present)
Blerim Gudjufi – Spektrum Novi Sad (2011–2012)
Jovan Gunev – Trajal Kruševac (200_–2008)
 Ilijevski – Rudar Bor (1988–1997)
Nelson Iseni – FK Vinča (200_–2010), FK Resnik (2010–present)
Bojan Ivanov – Balkan Mirijevo (2013–present)
Filip Jančevski – Hajduk Kula (2014–present)
Čedomir Janevski – Železničar Niš (1980–1982)
Stefan Josifoski – Sopot (2012)–2013), Jedinstvo Stara Pazova (2012–2014), Radnički Beograd (2014–2017), Jedinstvo Surčin (2017–present)
 Strahinja Krstevski – Grafičar (2019–present)
 Petar Krstić – Radan Lebane (201_–201_), Sloga Leskovac (201_–2015)
Vlade Lazarevski – 14. Oktobar Kruševac (2002–(2003), 2003–(2004), Temnić Lipa Varvarin (2015–present)
Aleksandar Lazevski – Teleoptik (2005–2008, 2008–2010), Vršac (2018–present)
Lazo Lipovski – FK Bor (199_–199_)
Branislav "Bane" Manevski – Lokomotiva Beograd (2016–2018), GSP Polet Dorćol (2018–present)
Boban Marić – Šumadija Jagnjilo (2007–2008), Radnički Nova Pazova (2008–2009)
Marjan Markoski – Radnički Zrenjanin (201_–2015)
Zoran Martinovski – Polet Beograd (1997–1998)
Igor Matenicarski – Sloga Požega (2003–2005), FK Crnokosa (200_–2008, 20__–2014)
Kliment Nastovski – FK Teleoptik (2004–2006)
Boban Nikolovski – FK Bor (1995–1996, 2003–(2004), Železničar Beograd (1999)–2000, 2001–(2002), Rudar Bor (200_–2006)
 Nikola Novevski - Radnički Stara Pazova (2020-2021), Bečej (2021)-2022), Radnički Zrenjanin (2021-(2022), Bačka Bačka Palanka (2022-present)
Dušan Pavlov – OFK Kikinda (2007–2010), FK Bačka Topola (2010–2011)
Marko Pavlov – ŽAK Sombor (2012–2013)
 Petrovski – FK Bor (1993–1996)
Bojan Petrovski – Aluminijum Niš (2006–2007)
Predrag Ranđelović – FK Teleoptik (2008–2011)
Stevica Ristić – FK Vršac (2000–2001), Jedinstvo Vršac (2001–2002)
Dušan Savić – Dubočica Leskovac (–2002,2020–present)
Đorđe Serpak – Trudbenik Beograd (199_–1993)
Aleksandar Simjanovski – Topličanin Prokuplje
Ivan Simjanovski – Topličanin Prokuplje
Marko Simunovikj – IM Rakovica (2017–2018), Teleoptik (2018-2022)
Jovan Sovreski – FK Voždovac (2009)–2010), FK Dorćol (2009–(2010)
Perica Stančeski – FK Teleoptik (2004–2006)
Ostoja Stjepanović – FK Teleoptik (2003–2005)
Milan Stoilković – Hajduk Beograd (2009)–2010, 2011–2012, 2013–present), Hajduk Šimanovci (2009–(2010), FK Voždovac (2010–2011), Slavija Beograd (2012–2013)
Nikola Stojanov – FK Brodarac (2015–(2016), Lokomotiva Beograd (2015)–2016, 2018–present), IMT Novi Beograd (2016–2018)
Nikola Stojanović – BSK Bujanovac (2001–2005, 2017–2018), Dinamo Vranje (2005–2013, 2016–2017), Železničar Vr.Banja (2007–2008), Radnik Surdulica (2008–2009, 2013–2016)
Milan Stojanovski – BASK Beograd (2009)–2010), Lokomotiva Beograd (2009–2011), FK Kovačevac (2010–(2011)
Aleksandar Todorovski – Radnički Beograd (2002–2005)
Miloš Tošeski – Brodarac (201_–present)
Nikola Tošeski – FK Brodarac (2013–2015, (2016)–2017, 2019–present), FK Smederevo (2015)–2016, 2018–2019), IM Rakovica (2015–(2016)
Vladimir Tošeski – FK Brodarac (2014–2015), FK Smederevo (2015–present)
Haris Tutić – FK Tutin (2014–present)
Lazar Vidić – Šumadija Kragujevac (2006–2009, 2017–present), Radnički Kragujevac (2009–2011)

Northern Ireland 
John Barrons – IMT Novi Beograd (2001–2002)

Norway 
Bojan Jakovic – Jedinstvo Kalenić (200_–2006), FK 1. Maj Ruma (2008–2011)

Palestine 
Hani Odeh – Železnik (201_–present)

Poland 
Tadeusz Batkowski – Kadima Bečkerek (192_–1924), Kosovo Kikinda (1924–192_)
Aleksander Čišič – Radnički Beograd (2012–2013), FK Jošanica (2013)–2014), Krušik Valjevo (2013–(2014), Dinamo Pančevo (2014–(2015), Dolina Padina (2015)–2016), Železničar Pančevo (2015–2016)
Jan Nosal – Jedinstvo Stević (2002–2005, 2006–200_, 20__–2014)

Portugal 
Maki Faria - BASK Beograd (2020-2021)
Vuk Kovacevic – Budućnost Dobanovci (2014)–2015), BASK Beograd (2014–2016, 2018–2019), FK Žarkovo (2016–2018), Crvena zvezda MML (2019–present)
Ivan Mladenović – Sinđelić Niš (2016–2017), Car Konstantin (2017–present)
Angelo Stevanovic – Srem Jakovo (2013–present)

Puerto Rico 
Chris Megaloudis – Radnički Obrenovac (2009–2010)

Romania 
Franc Baroul – Kadima V. Bečkerek (1924–1925)
Ionel Carabas – Palilulac Beograd (197_–19__)
Ioan Răzvan Chiriţă – Jedinstvo Petrovac (199_–199_)
Mihail Costescu – Radnički Vršac (1998–1999)
Olimpiu Deac – Budućnost Srpska Crnja (1990–1991)
Ștefan Dobrescu – FK Sopot (2017–present)
Dimitru Drindea – Sloga Petrovac na Mlavi (1990–1991)
Ștefan Dumitru – Sloga Petrovac na Mlavi (1990–1991)
Alberto Emanuel – FK Vršac (199_–199_)
Aurel Han – Zorka Subotica (1990–1991)
Gheorghe Iordan – Sloga Petrovac na Mlavi (1990–1991)
József Kezdi – Viktorija Vršac (1936–1937)
Kiril Kostel – Budućnost Alibunar (199_–199_)
Lăcătuș – Jugoslavija Jabuka (1937–19__)
Romeo Malak – FK Vršac (199_–199_)
Gheorghe Mureşan – Budućnost Srpska Crnja (1990–1991)
Marinel Pascu – Radnički Bajmok (2002–2003), FK Bečej (200_–200_)
Păunescu – Grafičar Beograd (1939–1940)
Branimir Pavlov – Jedinstvo Novi Bečej (1991–1992, 1992–(1993)
Dario Todor – FK Vršac (2015–2016)
Mateja Vezilici – JNA team (1945)

Russia 
Nikolai Alexeyev – Ruski SK (1924–192_)
Chakarev – Borac Čačak (1966–1967)
Asteri Filaktov – Palilulac Beograd, Bor (1964–1965)
Aleksandr Frangu – Železnik (201_–present)
Ilya Guchmazov – Grafičar Beograd (2020–2021)
Andrei Guzienko – Bečej (1990–1992)
Igor – Maksim Divnić Zemun (1945)
Marko Jeremis – Mladi Radnik (20__–present)
Uchuk Kuldinov – Ruski SK (1930–193_), Sinđelić Beograd (1937–1941)
Maksim Lada – Grafičar Beograd (2018–2020), Brodarac (2020-2021), Žarkovo (2021-2022)
Konstantin Lalionov – Ruski SK (1924–192x)
Aleksandr Minayev – Budućnost Valjevo (1990–1991)
Aleksandr Nazarko - Bor (2020–present)
Danil Pechenkin – Grafičar Beograd (2017–2019)
Anton Pushin – Građanski Ćuprija (1937–1938)
Dmitri Shikhovtsev – Radnički Kragujevac (2008–2010)
Stefan Shilovtsev – Momčilo Leskovac (1923–1924)
Aleksandr Shtcheglov – Jug Bogdan Prokuplje (1919–1925)
Gennadi Soshenko – Budućnost Valjevo (1990–1991)
Igor Vasilyev – Ruski SK (1924–192_)
Rastislav Vasilyev – Ruski SK (1924–192_)
Vladimir Vinogradov – Ruski SK (1924–192_)
Sergei Vitvinskiy – Ruski SK (192_–192_)
Vorontsov – FK Bor (1952–1953)
Mikhail Yagovlev – Ruski SK (1924–192x)
Alexei Yashuk – Palilulac Beograd (2010–2011)
Sergei Yerniev – Mačva Šabac (1919)

Saudi Arabia 
 Yazeed Yahya Jawshan - Zemun (2022-present)

Senegal 
Mamadou Diarra – Teleoptik (2008–2009)

Sierra Leone 
Kelfala Marah – Rudar Kostolac (2005–2010)

Slovakia 
Boris Durgala – Dolina Padina (2011–201x)
Silvester Galamboš – FK Palić (200_–200_), Radnički Bajmok (200_–2010)
Vladimír Gombár – Srem Sr. Mitrovica (1993–1994)
Ladislav Gonda – FK Majdanpek (1937–193_)
Boris Hesek – Bane Raška (2013–2014)
Nikola Makar – Radnički Sombor (2012–2014), PIK Prigrevica (2014–2015), Bratstvo Prigrevica (2015–present)
Ján Podhradský – SŠK Bački Petrovac (1933–1935), SK Štefanik Stara Pazova (1939–1941)
Boris Sekulić – Grafičar Beograd (2009–2010), FK Beograd (2010–2011)
 Marko Turan – IMT Novi Beograd (2014–2016), Srem Jakovo (2015–(2016), Radnički Obrenovac (2019–present)

Slovenia 
The players that have played for the Slovenian national team are in bold, the others have played since 1992.
Živko Aleksandrić – FK Prijevor (2008–2012), FK Bačka Topola (2012–2013), Partizan Bumbarevo Brdo (2013–present)
Saša Bosilj – Železničar Lajkovac (2002–2003)
Marko Drljača – Jedinstvo Novi Bečej (2004–2006, 2006–2013, 2013–present), Tekstilac Odžaci (2006)–2007), FK Brezovica (2013)–2014)
Nermin Horvat – Rudar Kostolac (2004–2008)
Nebojša Ivanović – Radnički Sombor (2013–2014), Bratstvo Prigrevica (2015–present)
Safet Jahič – FK Teleoptik (2006–2007)
Boris Klabec – FK Vršac (2009–2010), Dolina Padina (2010–2011)
Dušan Makarić – Grafičar Beograd (2006–2007), BSK Batajnica (2007–2008, (2014)–2015), Železničar Beograd (2008–2010), Posovac Boljevci (2010–2011), Radnički Nova Pazova (2011–2012), FK Sopot (2012–2013), FK Zemun (2013–2014), Sremac Vojka (2014–(2015)
Vladimir Mandić – Banat Zrenjanin (2013–2014), OFK Vršac (2018)–2019), Železničar Pančevo (2018–2020), Bratstvo Prigrevica (2020)–2021), Cement Beočin (2020–present)
Mladen Marković – Kabel Novi Sad (2007–2008)
Vladimir Ostojić – Mačva Šabac (199_–199_)
Denis Salkunič – Mačva Šabac (2010–201_)
Andrej Vitali – Hajduk Beograd (2014)–2015), FK Baćevac (2014–present)

Sweden 
Jovan Jakovljević – Bačka Subotica (2017–2018)
Philip Milenković – Radnički Obrenovac (2010–2011)

Switzerland 
Toplica Avramović – FK Zvezdara (2011–2012), Bulbuderac Beograd (2012)–2013), FK Dorćol (2012–201x)
Pajtim Badalli – FK 14. Oktobar (2014–2015)
Milan Basrak – FK Sopot (2012)–2013), Mačva Šabac (2012–(2013)
Mihailo Bogicevic – FK Loznica (2019–2021)
Boško Borenović – FK Zemun (1991–1999, 2006–2007)
Darko Damjanović – Mačva Šabac (2011–2012)
Aleksandar Djuric – Hajduk Beograd (2009–2010)
Svetlan Kosić – IMT Beograd (2014–2015)
Aleksandar Njeguš – Zlatibor Čajetina (2017–present)
Zeljko Ognjanovic – FK Šapine (2003–201x)
Emil Osmanovic – FK Jošanica (2014)–2015), Železničar Lajkovac (2015–2016), Mladi Radnik (2019–present)
Milaim Rama – KF Beselidhja (1996–1997)
Luka Stević – FK Teleoptik (2019–2020)
Aleksandar Todorović – Mačva Šabac (2011–2013), Mladost Bački Jarak (2016–2017)
Miroslav Trajković – Sinđelić Niš (2013)–2014), (2015)–2016), Moravac Mrštane (2013–(2014), 2014–(2015), Ozren Sokobanja (2014)–2015), Radan Lebane (2015–(2016), Budućnost Popovac (2016–2018), Car Konstantin (2018–present)
Yves Vladislav – FK Teleoptik (2016–2018), OFK Beograd (2019–2020)

Tanzania 
 Nassor Hamoud – Šumadija Aranđelovac (2020–2023)

Turkey 
Serif Çoroğlu – BSK Borča (1998–1999)
Günkut Özer – Sinđelić Niš (2014)–2015), Palilulac Niš (2014–(2015)

Ukraine 
Maksym Demchenko – Palić (1990–1991)
Gantchev – Bačka Subotica (1994–1995)
Andriy Gordon – Sloboda Užice (2000–2002), Sloga Požega (2006–2008)
Serhiy Gordon – Sloboda Užice (2000–2002), Sloga Požega (2006–2008)
Sasha Havrlyenko – AIK Bačka Topola (1991–1998)
Aleksandar Pisarenko – Proleter Majdanpek (194_–195_)
Makariy Tkachenko – Metalac Bor (1953–1955), Proleter Majdanpek (1962–1963)
Vitaliy Tolmachyov – Mladost Končarevo (1991–1992), Palić (1992–1993), Bačka Subotica (1994–1996)
Trile – Palilulac Beograd (1962–1963)
Maksym Zinakov – Radnički Nova Pazova (2008–2009)

United States 
 Aleksandar Gluvačević - Dorcol (2016-2017), Dunav Stari Banovci (2017-2018), Vršac (2018-2019)
 Slaviša Krstić – Teleoptik (2005–2008)
 Vuk Latinovich – Brodarac (2014–2017)
 Luka Nedić – Loznica (2019–2020)
 Michael Palacio – Radnički Obrenovac (2009–2010)
 George Pantelic – Morava Velika Plana (2010)–2011), Zemun (2010–2013)
 Danilo Radjen – Teleoptik (2019–2020)
 Peter Thomas – Bane Raška (2003–2008)
 Aleksandar Thomas Višić – Resnik (2011)–2012), Zemun (2012–2013)

Uzbekistan 
 Rauf Mirolim – Omladinac Pirot (1923–1925)

References and notes

See also
 List of foreign footballers in top leagues of former Yugoslavia

Notes
Additional information
 In English, the capital city of Serbia, Beograd, is called Belgrade.
 In Serbian, Red Star Belgrade is named FK Crvena zvezda.

Sponsorship names
The list uses the original club names, however, in some cases, certain clubs during one, or more, seasons, used sponsorship names in those specific times. Here is the list to identify those clubs and their sponsorship names:
 FK Čukarički, initially formed as ČSK (Čukarički SK), became sponsored for much of the 1990s by Stankom and was vastly known as FK Čukarički Staknom.
 FK Zemun was for much of the 1980s sponsored by pharmaceutical company Galenika and became known as FK Galenika Zemun.
 FK Smederevo was known from 1992 until 2004 as FK Sartid or Sartid 1913, indicated here as Sartid Smederevo. The exception was made here because the club was founded by the company and spent most of its history using the name Sartid.
 FK Spartak Subotica was merged in 2007 with FK Zlatibor Voda (a club from Horgoš sponsored by the company Zlatibor Voda, and, between 2007 and 2014, played under sponsor name of FK Spartak Zlatibor Voda. Since 2018 it is officially using again a sponsorship name, this time as FK Spartak Ždrepčeva krv.
 TSC Bačka Topola was known for most of its history as AIK Bačka Topola.
 FK Radnički Beograd was known for most of the 1990s as FK Radnički Jugopetrol.
 FK Javor Ivanjica has been officially sponsored by local company Matis and became known as FK Javor-Matis Ivanjica since 2017.
 GSK Jasenica 1911 was sponsored for much of the 1980s and 1990s by GOŠA and during that period played under name of FK Mladost GOŠA.
 FK ČSK Čelarevo was sponsored for decades by local brewery company thus making the club widely known as FK ČSK Pivara.
 FK Mladost Apatin was formed by the owner of the local company Tri zvezde thus the club was known until 1945 as SK Tri zvezde Apatin.
 FK Srbobran was for decades sponsored by Elan thus known as FK Elan Srbobran.
 FK FAP Priboj is a club that was throughout its history sponsored by local truck manufacturer FAP and has kept its name until today.
 FK Trstenik was for much of its history known by the name of the local company Prva petoletka, thus resulting in FK PPT Trstenik.
 During the 1990s, FK Timok Zaječar was sponsored by local company Kristal and became known as FK Timok Kristal Zaječar.

Mergers
 Two of the oldest Serbian clubs, Konkordija and Vardar, both from Belgrade, merged and formed SK Jedinstvo Beograd.
 Another important of the oldest clubs was SK Soko from Belgrade that changed its name to FK BASK.
 FK Voždovac, was known as SK Dušanovac during its earliest period.
 FK Milicionar Beograd was a club from Belgrade that was founded in 1946 and dissolved and merged into an already existing FK Radnički Obrenovac in 2001.
 SK Jugoslavija was one of the most successful clubs in Yugoslavia until the WWII. It was a club from Belgrade that was formed in 1913 and was disbanded by the new socialist authorities in 1945. Most of its property was handed over to the newly formed Red Star Belgrade. From 1941 until 1944 it was named SK 1913.
 BSK Beograd was renamed into OFK Beograd in 1957. After WWII was also known as FK Metalac Beograd.
 FK Priština is since 1999 more commonly known in its Albanian translation form as KF Prishtina, and, as the majority of the clubs from the territory of Kosovo, has been absent from the Serbian football league system since then.
 FK Sloboda Užice was merged with FK Sevojno in 2010, and after playing the season 2010-11 and beginning of 2011-12 as FK Sloboda Point Sevojno, it restored its name in October 2011.
 FK Vojvodina was known as FK Sloga Novi Sad for some years after WWII.

External sources

 National-Football-Teams
 Srbijafudbal
 EUFO
 Weltfussball
 Soccerway
 Superliga
 Fudbalske lige SiCG
 Zerodic
 Zerozero
 rsssf, Ital-players-abroad
 rsssf, Arg players
 Brazil transfers
 YU Football
 League stats 2004-07 EX SiCG Fudbal
 Macedonian players abroad at Utrinski
 Derbi pre derbija

Foreign
 
Serbia
Association football player non-biographical articles